

430001–430100 

|-bgcolor=#E9E9E9
| 430001 ||  || — || October 24, 2009 || Kitt Peak || Spacewatch || — || align=right data-sort-value="0.92" | 920 m || 
|-id=002 bgcolor=#E9E9E9
| 430002 ||  || — || September 23, 2008 || Mount Lemmon || Mount Lemmon Survey || — || align=right | 2.5 km || 
|-id=003 bgcolor=#fefefe
| 430003 ||  || — || November 20, 2006 || Kitt Peak || Spacewatch || — || align=right data-sort-value="0.61" | 610 m || 
|-id=004 bgcolor=#E9E9E9
| 430004 ||  || — || October 6, 2004 || Kitt Peak || Spacewatch || — || align=right | 1.8 km || 
|-id=005 bgcolor=#fefefe
| 430005 ||  || — || November 29, 2003 || Kitt Peak || Spacewatch || — || align=right data-sort-value="0.80" | 800 m || 
|-id=006 bgcolor=#fefefe
| 430006 ||  || — || February 28, 2008 || Kitt Peak || Spacewatch || — || align=right data-sort-value="0.73" | 730 m || 
|-id=007 bgcolor=#fefefe
| 430007 ||  || — || January 13, 2011 || Mount Lemmon || Mount Lemmon Survey || V || align=right data-sort-value="0.74" | 740 m || 
|-id=008 bgcolor=#fefefe
| 430008 ||  || — || October 12, 2010 || Mount Lemmon || Mount Lemmon Survey || — || align=right data-sort-value="0.64" | 640 m || 
|-id=009 bgcolor=#fefefe
| 430009 ||  || — || August 28, 2006 || Kitt Peak || Spacewatch || — || align=right data-sort-value="0.70" | 700 m || 
|-id=010 bgcolor=#fefefe
| 430010 ||  || — || October 24, 2003 || Kitt Peak || Spacewatch || — || align=right data-sort-value="0.62" | 620 m || 
|-id=011 bgcolor=#E9E9E9
| 430011 ||  || — || January 30, 2011 || Mount Lemmon || Mount Lemmon Survey || — || align=right | 1.5 km || 
|-id=012 bgcolor=#E9E9E9
| 430012 ||  || — || August 28, 2005 || Kitt Peak || Spacewatch || KRM || align=right | 1.5 km || 
|-id=013 bgcolor=#E9E9E9
| 430013 ||  || — || April 30, 2003 || Kitt Peak || Spacewatch || — || align=right | 1.8 km || 
|-id=014 bgcolor=#fefefe
| 430014 ||  || — || January 26, 2007 || Kitt Peak || Spacewatch || — || align=right data-sort-value="0.82" | 820 m || 
|-id=015 bgcolor=#E9E9E9
| 430015 ||  || — || September 1, 2013 || Mount Lemmon || Mount Lemmon Survey || — || align=right | 1.8 km || 
|-id=016 bgcolor=#fefefe
| 430016 ||  || — || September 22, 2000 || Kitt Peak || Spacewatch || — || align=right data-sort-value="0.67" | 670 m || 
|-id=017 bgcolor=#fefefe
| 430017 ||  || — || January 13, 2011 || Mount Lemmon || Mount Lemmon Survey || — || align=right data-sort-value="0.80" | 800 m || 
|-id=018 bgcolor=#fefefe
| 430018 ||  || — || January 27, 2007 || Kitt Peak || Spacewatch || NYS || align=right data-sort-value="0.86" | 860 m || 
|-id=019 bgcolor=#E9E9E9
| 430019 ||  || — || December 20, 2009 || Mount Lemmon || Mount Lemmon Survey || — || align=right | 2.2 km || 
|-id=020 bgcolor=#E9E9E9
| 430020 ||  || — || January 7, 2006 || Kitt Peak || Spacewatch || — || align=right | 1.2 km || 
|-id=021 bgcolor=#E9E9E9
| 430021 ||  || — || October 4, 1999 || Kitt Peak || Spacewatch || GEF || align=right | 1.2 km || 
|-id=022 bgcolor=#d6d6d6
| 430022 ||  || — || September 4, 2013 || Mount Lemmon || Mount Lemmon Survey || KOR || align=right | 1.3 km || 
|-id=023 bgcolor=#d6d6d6
| 430023 ||  || — || October 24, 2008 || Catalina || CSS || — || align=right | 2.7 km || 
|-id=024 bgcolor=#E9E9E9
| 430024 ||  || — || January 7, 2006 || Kitt Peak || Spacewatch || EUN || align=right | 1.2 km || 
|-id=025 bgcolor=#fefefe
| 430025 ||  || — || December 15, 2006 || Kitt Peak || Spacewatch || — || align=right data-sort-value="0.76" | 760 m || 
|-id=026 bgcolor=#fefefe
| 430026 ||  || — || December 13, 2006 || Mount Lemmon || Mount Lemmon Survey || — || align=right data-sort-value="0.84" | 840 m || 
|-id=027 bgcolor=#fefefe
| 430027 ||  || — || November 21, 2006 || Mount Lemmon || Mount Lemmon Survey || MAS || align=right data-sort-value="0.81" | 810 m || 
|-id=028 bgcolor=#d6d6d6
| 430028 ||  || — || February 17, 2010 || Kitt Peak || Spacewatch || — || align=right | 2.8 km || 
|-id=029 bgcolor=#E9E9E9
| 430029 ||  || — || February 8, 2002 || Kitt Peak || Spacewatch || — || align=right | 2.0 km || 
|-id=030 bgcolor=#fefefe
| 430030 ||  || — || February 26, 2012 || Mount Lemmon || Mount Lemmon Survey || V || align=right data-sort-value="0.56" | 560 m || 
|-id=031 bgcolor=#fefefe
| 430031 ||  || — || January 19, 2012 || Mount Lemmon || Mount Lemmon Survey || — || align=right data-sort-value="0.69" | 690 m || 
|-id=032 bgcolor=#fefefe
| 430032 ||  || — || February 9, 2008 || Kitt Peak || Spacewatch || — || align=right data-sort-value="0.84" | 840 m || 
|-id=033 bgcolor=#fefefe
| 430033 ||  || — || January 1, 2008 || Kitt Peak || Spacewatch || — || align=right data-sort-value="0.75" | 750 m || 
|-id=034 bgcolor=#d6d6d6
| 430034 ||  || — || November 20, 2003 || Kitt Peak || Spacewatch || EOS || align=right | 2.1 km || 
|-id=035 bgcolor=#d6d6d6
| 430035 ||  || — || January 19, 2004 || Kitt Peak || Spacewatch || — || align=right | 3.0 km || 
|-id=036 bgcolor=#E9E9E9
| 430036 ||  || — || November 21, 2009 || Mount Lemmon || Mount Lemmon Survey || — || align=right | 2.1 km || 
|-id=037 bgcolor=#E9E9E9
| 430037 ||  || — || October 23, 2009 || Kitt Peak || Spacewatch || — || align=right | 1.4 km || 
|-id=038 bgcolor=#fefefe
| 430038 ||  || — || September 30, 2006 || Catalina || CSS || — || align=right data-sort-value="0.76" | 760 m || 
|-id=039 bgcolor=#E9E9E9
| 430039 ||  || — || October 21, 2009 || Mount Lemmon || Mount Lemmon Survey || — || align=right | 1.3 km || 
|-id=040 bgcolor=#d6d6d6
| 430040 ||  || — || March 4, 2005 || Mount Lemmon || Mount Lemmon Survey || — || align=right | 3.5 km || 
|-id=041 bgcolor=#E9E9E9
| 430041 ||  || — || February 16, 2007 || Catalina || CSS || MAR || align=right | 1.3 km || 
|-id=042 bgcolor=#fefefe
| 430042 ||  || — || September 13, 2013 || Kitt Peak || Spacewatch || — || align=right data-sort-value="0.82" | 820 m || 
|-id=043 bgcolor=#E9E9E9
| 430043 ||  || — || March 12, 2007 || Kitt Peak || Spacewatch || — || align=right | 1.4 km || 
|-id=044 bgcolor=#E9E9E9
| 430044 ||  || — || March 4, 2006 || Kitt Peak || Spacewatch || — || align=right | 2.1 km || 
|-id=045 bgcolor=#fefefe
| 430045 ||  || — || March 15, 2012 || Kitt Peak || Spacewatch || — || align=right data-sort-value="0.83" | 830 m || 
|-id=046 bgcolor=#E9E9E9
| 430046 ||  || — || January 30, 2006 || Kitt Peak || Spacewatch || — || align=right | 2.0 km || 
|-id=047 bgcolor=#E9E9E9
| 430047 ||  || — || September 11, 2004 || Kitt Peak || Spacewatch || — || align=right | 1.5 km || 
|-id=048 bgcolor=#fefefe
| 430048 ||  || — || September 11, 2010 || Mount Lemmon || Mount Lemmon Survey || — || align=right data-sort-value="0.67" | 670 m || 
|-id=049 bgcolor=#E9E9E9
| 430049 ||  || — || February 25, 2011 || Mount Lemmon || Mount Lemmon Survey || — || align=right | 2.2 km || 
|-id=050 bgcolor=#fefefe
| 430050 ||  || — || August 31, 2005 || Kitt Peak || Spacewatch || — || align=right data-sort-value="0.82" | 820 m || 
|-id=051 bgcolor=#E9E9E9
| 430051 ||  || — || February 25, 2006 || Mount Lemmon || Mount Lemmon Survey || AGN || align=right data-sort-value="0.98" | 980 m || 
|-id=052 bgcolor=#fefefe
| 430052 ||  || — || December 19, 2003 || Socorro || LINEAR || — || align=right | 1.2 km || 
|-id=053 bgcolor=#d6d6d6
| 430053 ||  || — || September 6, 2008 || Mount Lemmon || Mount Lemmon Survey || — || align=right | 3.9 km || 
|-id=054 bgcolor=#E9E9E9
| 430054 ||  || — || September 9, 2004 || Socorro || LINEAR || — || align=right | 2.0 km || 
|-id=055 bgcolor=#E9E9E9
| 430055 ||  || — || April 19, 2007 || Mount Lemmon || Mount Lemmon Survey || AGN || align=right | 1.3 km || 
|-id=056 bgcolor=#E9E9E9
| 430056 ||  || — || October 3, 2000 || Socorro || LINEAR || EUN || align=right | 1.3 km || 
|-id=057 bgcolor=#d6d6d6
| 430057 ||  || — || November 19, 2008 || Kitt Peak || Spacewatch || — || align=right | 2.7 km || 
|-id=058 bgcolor=#E9E9E9
| 430058 ||  || — || November 17, 2009 || Mount Lemmon || Mount Lemmon Survey || — || align=right | 1.9 km || 
|-id=059 bgcolor=#E9E9E9
| 430059 ||  || — || February 3, 2010 || WISE || WISE || — || align=right | 2.8 km || 
|-id=060 bgcolor=#d6d6d6
| 430060 ||  || — || December 22, 2008 || Mount Lemmon || Mount Lemmon Survey || — || align=right | 2.8 km || 
|-id=061 bgcolor=#d6d6d6
| 430061 ||  || — || December 21, 2008 || Kitt Peak || Spacewatch || — || align=right | 3.4 km || 
|-id=062 bgcolor=#d6d6d6
| 430062 ||  || — || February 12, 2004 || Kitt Peak || Spacewatch || — || align=right | 3.1 km || 
|-id=063 bgcolor=#fefefe
| 430063 ||  || — || November 30, 2003 || Kitt Peak || Spacewatch || — || align=right data-sort-value="0.70" | 700 m || 
|-id=064 bgcolor=#fefefe
| 430064 ||  || — || September 28, 2006 || Mount Lemmon || Mount Lemmon Survey || NYS || align=right data-sort-value="0.84" | 840 m || 
|-id=065 bgcolor=#fefefe
| 430065 ||  || — || October 15, 1998 || Kitt Peak || Spacewatch || — || align=right data-sort-value="0.74" | 740 m || 
|-id=066 bgcolor=#fefefe
| 430066 ||  || — || November 20, 2006 || Kitt Peak || Spacewatch || — || align=right | 1.1 km || 
|-id=067 bgcolor=#d6d6d6
| 430067 ||  || — || January 10, 2000 || Kitt Peak || Spacewatch || KOR || align=right | 1.6 km || 
|-id=068 bgcolor=#fefefe
| 430068 ||  || — || January 23, 2011 || Mount Lemmon || Mount Lemmon Survey || — || align=right data-sort-value="0.76" | 760 m || 
|-id=069 bgcolor=#E9E9E9
| 430069 ||  || — || March 29, 2010 || WISE || WISE || DOR || align=right | 2.1 km || 
|-id=070 bgcolor=#E9E9E9
| 430070 ||  || — || February 9, 2002 || Kitt Peak || Spacewatch || — || align=right | 1.4 km || 
|-id=071 bgcolor=#fefefe
| 430071 ||  || — || September 11, 2010 || Mount Lemmon || Mount Lemmon Survey || — || align=right data-sort-value="0.77" | 770 m || 
|-id=072 bgcolor=#fefefe
| 430072 ||  || — || August 28, 2006 || Catalina || CSS || — || align=right data-sort-value="0.72" | 720 m || 
|-id=073 bgcolor=#d6d6d6
| 430073 ||  || — || April 14, 2010 || WISE || WISE || — || align=right | 4.1 km || 
|-id=074 bgcolor=#fefefe
| 430074 ||  || — || September 19, 2006 || Catalina || CSS || V || align=right data-sort-value="0.65" | 650 m || 
|-id=075 bgcolor=#E9E9E9
| 430075 ||  || — || September 5, 2013 || Catalina || CSS || — || align=right | 2.5 km || 
|-id=076 bgcolor=#d6d6d6
| 430076 ||  || — || September 24, 2008 || Kitt Peak || Spacewatch || — || align=right | 2.4 km || 
|-id=077 bgcolor=#E9E9E9
| 430077 ||  || — || September 21, 2009 || Mount Lemmon || Mount Lemmon Survey || EUN || align=right | 1.1 km || 
|-id=078 bgcolor=#d6d6d6
| 430078 ||  || — || March 14, 2004 || Kitt Peak || Spacewatch || — || align=right | 2.6 km || 
|-id=079 bgcolor=#E9E9E9
| 430079 ||  || — || September 8, 2008 || Siding Spring || SSS || — || align=right | 3.4 km || 
|-id=080 bgcolor=#fefefe
| 430080 ||  || — || August 26, 2009 || Catalina || CSS || NYS || align=right data-sort-value="0.64" | 640 m || 
|-id=081 bgcolor=#fefefe
| 430081 ||  || — || April 28, 2004 || Kitt Peak || Spacewatch || — || align=right | 1.0 km || 
|-id=082 bgcolor=#E9E9E9
| 430082 ||  || — || November 19, 2009 || Kitt Peak || Spacewatch || — || align=right | 1.1 km || 
|-id=083 bgcolor=#E9E9E9
| 430083 ||  || — || October 31, 2005 || Mount Lemmon || Mount Lemmon Survey || — || align=right | 1.4 km || 
|-id=084 bgcolor=#d6d6d6
| 430084 ||  || — || October 27, 2008 || Mount Lemmon || Mount Lemmon Survey || — || align=right | 2.8 km || 
|-id=085 bgcolor=#d6d6d6
| 430085 ||  || — || October 11, 2007 || Mount Lemmon || Mount Lemmon Survey || — || align=right | 3.1 km || 
|-id=086 bgcolor=#d6d6d6
| 430086 ||  || — || February 15, 2010 || Kitt Peak || Spacewatch || — || align=right | 2.9 km || 
|-id=087 bgcolor=#d6d6d6
| 430087 ||  || — || October 19, 2003 || Kitt Peak || Spacewatch || — || align=right | 2.8 km || 
|-id=088 bgcolor=#E9E9E9
| 430088 ||  || — || September 29, 2008 || Catalina || CSS || AGN || align=right | 1.3 km || 
|-id=089 bgcolor=#E9E9E9
| 430089 ||  || — || September 13, 2013 || Catalina || CSS || — || align=right | 2.4 km || 
|-id=090 bgcolor=#d6d6d6
| 430090 ||  || — || March 11, 2005 || Catalina || CSS ||  || align=right | 4.1 km || 
|-id=091 bgcolor=#fefefe
| 430091 ||  || — || October 4, 2006 || Mount Lemmon || Mount Lemmon Survey || — || align=right data-sort-value="0.65" | 650 m || 
|-id=092 bgcolor=#fefefe
| 430092 ||  || — || April 22, 2009 || Mount Lemmon || Mount Lemmon Survey || — || align=right data-sort-value="0.66" | 660 m || 
|-id=093 bgcolor=#fefefe
| 430093 ||  || — || October 17, 2010 || Mount Lemmon || Mount Lemmon Survey || — || align=right data-sort-value="0.75" | 750 m || 
|-id=094 bgcolor=#E9E9E9
| 430094 ||  || — || March 30, 2011 || Mount Lemmon || Mount Lemmon Survey || — || align=right | 1.2 km || 
|-id=095 bgcolor=#E9E9E9
| 430095 ||  || — || February 16, 2007 || Catalina || CSS || — || align=right | 2.0 km || 
|-id=096 bgcolor=#E9E9E9
| 430096 ||  || — || October 12, 2004 || Socorro || LINEAR || — || align=right | 2.9 km || 
|-id=097 bgcolor=#fefefe
| 430097 ||  || — || May 16, 2005 || Mount Lemmon || Mount Lemmon Survey || — || align=right | 1.1 km || 
|-id=098 bgcolor=#d6d6d6
| 430098 ||  || — || February 13, 2004 || Kitt Peak || Spacewatch || — || align=right | 2.5 km || 
|-id=099 bgcolor=#fefefe
| 430099 ||  || — || March 1, 2005 || Kitt Peak || Spacewatch || — || align=right data-sort-value="0.90" | 900 m || 
|-id=100 bgcolor=#fefefe
| 430100 ||  || — || December 21, 2003 || Socorro || LINEAR || — || align=right data-sort-value="0.71" | 710 m || 
|}

430101–430200 

|-bgcolor=#d6d6d6
| 430101 ||  || — || November 27, 2009 || Mount Lemmon || Mount Lemmon Survey || — || align=right | 3.0 km || 
|-id=102 bgcolor=#fefefe
| 430102 ||  || — || December 19, 2004 || Mount Lemmon || Mount Lemmon Survey || — || align=right data-sort-value="0.87" | 870 m || 
|-id=103 bgcolor=#E9E9E9
| 430103 ||  || — || January 9, 2006 || Kitt Peak || Spacewatch || — || align=right | 1.6 km || 
|-id=104 bgcolor=#fefefe
| 430104 ||  || — || September 27, 2006 || Mount Lemmon || Mount Lemmon Survey || V || align=right data-sort-value="0.81" | 810 m || 
|-id=105 bgcolor=#E9E9E9
| 430105 ||  || — || October 6, 1999 || Kitt Peak || Spacewatch || — || align=right | 2.2 km || 
|-id=106 bgcolor=#fefefe
| 430106 ||  || — || December 30, 2007 || Kitt Peak || Spacewatch || — || align=right data-sort-value="0.76" | 760 m || 
|-id=107 bgcolor=#E9E9E9
| 430107 ||  || — || November 12, 2005 || Kitt Peak || Spacewatch || — || align=right | 1.8 km || 
|-id=108 bgcolor=#d6d6d6
| 430108 ||  || — || September 30, 2013 || Mount Lemmon || Mount Lemmon Survey || — || align=right | 3.0 km || 
|-id=109 bgcolor=#fefefe
| 430109 ||  || — || May 28, 2008 || Kitt Peak || Spacewatch || — || align=right data-sort-value="0.83" | 830 m || 
|-id=110 bgcolor=#E9E9E9
| 430110 ||  || — || September 27, 2000 || Socorro || LINEAR || — || align=right | 1.6 km || 
|-id=111 bgcolor=#E9E9E9
| 430111 ||  || — || January 23, 2006 || Kitt Peak || Spacewatch || AGN || align=right | 1.3 km || 
|-id=112 bgcolor=#fefefe
| 430112 ||  || — || November 24, 2006 || Mount Lemmon || Mount Lemmon Survey || NYS || align=right data-sort-value="0.94" | 940 m || 
|-id=113 bgcolor=#E9E9E9
| 430113 ||  || — || March 6, 2011 || Mount Lemmon || Mount Lemmon Survey || MAR || align=right | 1.2 km || 
|-id=114 bgcolor=#E9E9E9
| 430114 ||  || — || January 4, 2010 || Kitt Peak || Spacewatch || — || align=right | 2.7 km || 
|-id=115 bgcolor=#fefefe
| 430115 ||  || — || February 12, 2004 || Kitt Peak || Spacewatch || V || align=right data-sort-value="0.65" | 650 m || 
|-id=116 bgcolor=#d6d6d6
| 430116 ||  || — || March 20, 2010 || Mount Lemmon || Mount Lemmon Survey || — || align=right | 2.9 km || 
|-id=117 bgcolor=#E9E9E9
| 430117 ||  || — || October 10, 2004 || Kitt Peak || Spacewatch || — || align=right | 2.1 km || 
|-id=118 bgcolor=#fefefe
| 430118 ||  || — || July 5, 2005 || Kitt Peak || Spacewatch || — || align=right data-sort-value="0.66" | 660 m || 
|-id=119 bgcolor=#fefefe
| 430119 ||  || — || July 21, 2006 || Mount Lemmon || Mount Lemmon Survey || — || align=right data-sort-value="0.74" | 740 m || 
|-id=120 bgcolor=#E9E9E9
| 430120 ||  || — || February 15, 2010 || Catalina || CSS || DOR || align=right | 1.7 km || 
|-id=121 bgcolor=#E9E9E9
| 430121 ||  || — || October 26, 2009 || Kitt Peak || Spacewatch || — || align=right | 1.5 km || 
|-id=122 bgcolor=#E9E9E9
| 430122 ||  || — || October 23, 2009 || Kitt Peak || Spacewatch || — || align=right | 1.2 km || 
|-id=123 bgcolor=#fefefe
| 430123 ||  || — || August 18, 2009 || Kitt Peak || Spacewatch || — || align=right data-sort-value="0.94" | 940 m || 
|-id=124 bgcolor=#fefefe
| 430124 ||  || — || January 17, 2007 || Kitt Peak || Spacewatch || MAS || align=right data-sort-value="0.84" | 840 m || 
|-id=125 bgcolor=#fefefe
| 430125 ||  || — || November 20, 2003 || Socorro || LINEAR || — || align=right data-sort-value="0.80" | 800 m || 
|-id=126 bgcolor=#E9E9E9
| 430126 ||  || — || September 9, 2008 || Mount Lemmon || Mount Lemmon Survey || — || align=right | 3.4 km || 
|-id=127 bgcolor=#d6d6d6
| 430127 ||  || — || February 15, 2010 || Kitt Peak || Spacewatch || — || align=right | 3.0 km || 
|-id=128 bgcolor=#E9E9E9
| 430128 ||  || — || November 20, 2004 || Kitt Peak || Spacewatch || AGN || align=right | 1.3 km || 
|-id=129 bgcolor=#E9E9E9
| 430129 ||  || — || October 5, 2004 || Kitt Peak || Spacewatch || — || align=right | 2.2 km || 
|-id=130 bgcolor=#fefefe
| 430130 ||  || — || December 1, 2003 || Kitt Peak || Spacewatch || — || align=right data-sort-value="0.87" | 870 m || 
|-id=131 bgcolor=#E9E9E9
| 430131 ||  || — || February 7, 2006 || Mount Lemmon || Mount Lemmon Survey || — || align=right | 2.3 km || 
|-id=132 bgcolor=#E9E9E9
| 430132 ||  || — || November 4, 2004 || Catalina || CSS || — || align=right | 1.9 km || 
|-id=133 bgcolor=#fefefe
| 430133 ||  || — || February 26, 2012 || Mount Lemmon || Mount Lemmon Survey || — || align=right data-sort-value="0.72" | 720 m || 
|-id=134 bgcolor=#E9E9E9
| 430134 ||  || — || October 26, 2009 || Mount Lemmon || Mount Lemmon Survey || — || align=right | 1.5 km || 
|-id=135 bgcolor=#fefefe
| 430135 ||  || — || September 30, 2006 || Mount Lemmon || Mount Lemmon Survey || — || align=right data-sort-value="0.75" | 750 m || 
|-id=136 bgcolor=#E9E9E9
| 430136 ||  || — || October 7, 2004 || Kitt Peak || Spacewatch || — || align=right | 2.2 km || 
|-id=137 bgcolor=#d6d6d6
| 430137 ||  || — || October 3, 2008 || Mount Lemmon || Mount Lemmon Survey || — || align=right | 2.9 km || 
|-id=138 bgcolor=#E9E9E9
| 430138 ||  || — || November 4, 2005 || Mount Lemmon || Mount Lemmon Survey || (5) || align=right data-sort-value="0.83" | 830 m || 
|-id=139 bgcolor=#E9E9E9
| 430139 ||  || — || April 2, 2006 || Catalina || CSS || EUN || align=right | 1.2 km || 
|-id=140 bgcolor=#d6d6d6
| 430140 ||  || — || February 13, 2004 || Kitt Peak || Spacewatch || — || align=right | 2.4 km || 
|-id=141 bgcolor=#d6d6d6
| 430141 ||  || — || September 19, 2008 || Kitt Peak || Spacewatch || — || align=right | 2.0 km || 
|-id=142 bgcolor=#fefefe
| 430142 ||  || — || August 15, 2009 || Kitt Peak || Spacewatch || — || align=right data-sort-value="0.83" | 830 m || 
|-id=143 bgcolor=#E9E9E9
| 430143 ||  || — || November 19, 2009 || Kitt Peak || Spacewatch || — || align=right | 1.4 km || 
|-id=144 bgcolor=#E9E9E9
| 430144 ||  || — || November 4, 2004 || Kitt Peak || Spacewatch || GEF || align=right | 1.2 km || 
|-id=145 bgcolor=#fefefe
| 430145 ||  || — || October 1, 2002 || Anderson Mesa || LONEOS || NYS || align=right data-sort-value="0.76" | 760 m || 
|-id=146 bgcolor=#d6d6d6
| 430146 ||  || — || September 13, 2013 || Mount Lemmon || Mount Lemmon Survey || KOR || align=right | 1.2 km || 
|-id=147 bgcolor=#E9E9E9
| 430147 ||  || — || January 23, 2006 || Kitt Peak || Spacewatch || — || align=right | 1.5 km || 
|-id=148 bgcolor=#d6d6d6
| 430148 ||  || — || September 10, 2007 || Mount Lemmon || Mount Lemmon Survey || THM || align=right | 2.2 km || 
|-id=149 bgcolor=#E9E9E9
| 430149 ||  || — || November 12, 1999 || Socorro || LINEAR || — || align=right | 2.5 km || 
|-id=150 bgcolor=#d6d6d6
| 430150 ||  || — || November 18, 2008 || Kitt Peak || Spacewatch || — || align=right | 2.2 km || 
|-id=151 bgcolor=#E9E9E9
| 430151 ||  || — || November 21, 2009 || Mount Lemmon || Mount Lemmon Survey || — || align=right | 2.0 km || 
|-id=152 bgcolor=#E9E9E9
| 430152 ||  || — || January 31, 2006 || Kitt Peak || Spacewatch || — || align=right | 1.9 km || 
|-id=153 bgcolor=#E9E9E9
| 430153 ||  || — || January 27, 2007 || Mount Lemmon || Mount Lemmon Survey || — || align=right | 1.1 km || 
|-id=154 bgcolor=#E9E9E9
| 430154 ||  || — || November 27, 2009 || Mount Lemmon || Mount Lemmon Survey || — || align=right | 2.5 km || 
|-id=155 bgcolor=#fefefe
| 430155 ||  || — || July 27, 2009 || Kitt Peak || Spacewatch || — || align=right data-sort-value="0.84" | 840 m || 
|-id=156 bgcolor=#E9E9E9
| 430156 ||  || — || March 14, 2010 || WISE || WISE || — || align=right | 1.7 km || 
|-id=157 bgcolor=#fefefe
| 430157 ||  || — || October 15, 1998 || Kitt Peak || Spacewatch || MAS || align=right data-sort-value="0.65" | 650 m || 
|-id=158 bgcolor=#d6d6d6
| 430158 ||  || — || February 16, 2010 || Kitt Peak || Spacewatch || THM || align=right | 2.4 km || 
|-id=159 bgcolor=#E9E9E9
| 430159 ||  || — || May 20, 2012 || Mount Lemmon || Mount Lemmon Survey || EUN || align=right | 1.3 km || 
|-id=160 bgcolor=#E9E9E9
| 430160 ||  || — || August 25, 2004 || Kitt Peak || Spacewatch || EUN || align=right | 1.1 km || 
|-id=161 bgcolor=#E9E9E9
| 430161 ||  || — || November 12, 2005 || Kitt Peak || Spacewatch || — || align=right data-sort-value="0.77" | 770 m || 
|-id=162 bgcolor=#E9E9E9
| 430162 ||  || — || November 11, 2004 || Kitt Peak || Spacewatch || — || align=right | 2.9 km || 
|-id=163 bgcolor=#d6d6d6
| 430163 ||  || — || October 15, 2007 || Mount Lemmon || Mount Lemmon Survey || — || align=right | 2.8 km || 
|-id=164 bgcolor=#E9E9E9
| 430164 ||  || — || August 26, 2000 || Socorro || LINEAR || — || align=right | 1.9 km || 
|-id=165 bgcolor=#E9E9E9
| 430165 ||  || — || August 22, 2004 || Kitt Peak || Spacewatch || — || align=right | 1.2 km || 
|-id=166 bgcolor=#d6d6d6
| 430166 ||  || — || October 22, 2008 || Kitt Peak || Spacewatch || — || align=right | 2.0 km || 
|-id=167 bgcolor=#E9E9E9
| 430167 ||  || — || February 13, 2007 || Mount Lemmon || Mount Lemmon Survey || — || align=right | 1.1 km || 
|-id=168 bgcolor=#E9E9E9
| 430168 ||  || — || October 8, 2004 || Kitt Peak || Spacewatch || — || align=right | 2.0 km || 
|-id=169 bgcolor=#E9E9E9
| 430169 ||  || — || September 7, 2004 || Kitt Peak || Spacewatch || — || align=right | 1.4 km || 
|-id=170 bgcolor=#d6d6d6
| 430170 ||  || — || October 18, 2003 || Kitt Peak || Spacewatch || — || align=right | 2.4 km || 
|-id=171 bgcolor=#E9E9E9
| 430171 ||  || — || November 21, 2009 || Kitt Peak || Spacewatch || — || align=right | 1.4 km || 
|-id=172 bgcolor=#d6d6d6
| 430172 ||  || — || October 27, 2008 || Kitt Peak || Spacewatch || — || align=right | 1.8 km || 
|-id=173 bgcolor=#fefefe
| 430173 ||  || — || September 17, 2006 || Catalina || CSS || — || align=right data-sort-value="0.78" | 780 m || 
|-id=174 bgcolor=#d6d6d6
| 430174 ||  || — || October 12, 2007 || Mount Lemmon || Mount Lemmon Survey || LIX || align=right | 3.7 km || 
|-id=175 bgcolor=#fefefe
| 430175 ||  || — || August 9, 2013 || Kitt Peak || Spacewatch || — || align=right data-sort-value="0.87" | 870 m || 
|-id=176 bgcolor=#fefefe
| 430176 ||  || — || March 28, 2008 || Mount Lemmon || Mount Lemmon Survey || — || align=right data-sort-value="0.76" | 760 m || 
|-id=177 bgcolor=#E9E9E9
| 430177 ||  || — || September 7, 2008 || Mount Lemmon || Mount Lemmon Survey || — || align=right | 2.1 km || 
|-id=178 bgcolor=#E9E9E9
| 430178 ||  || — || December 25, 2005 || Kitt Peak || Spacewatch || — || align=right | 1.5 km || 
|-id=179 bgcolor=#E9E9E9
| 430179 ||  || — || September 7, 2004 || Kitt Peak || Spacewatch || — || align=right | 1.3 km || 
|-id=180 bgcolor=#E9E9E9
| 430180 ||  || — || October 8, 2004 || Kitt Peak || Spacewatch || — || align=right | 1.8 km || 
|-id=181 bgcolor=#fefefe
| 430181 ||  || — || February 7, 2008 || Kitt Peak || Spacewatch || — || align=right data-sort-value="0.93" | 930 m || 
|-id=182 bgcolor=#fefefe
| 430182 ||  || — || September 21, 2009 || Mount Lemmon || Mount Lemmon Survey || — || align=right data-sort-value="0.75" | 750 m || 
|-id=183 bgcolor=#E9E9E9
| 430183 ||  || — || April 18, 2007 || Kitt Peak || Spacewatch || — || align=right | 2.1 km || 
|-id=184 bgcolor=#fefefe
| 430184 ||  || — || November 14, 2010 || Kitt Peak || Spacewatch || — || align=right data-sort-value="0.71" | 710 m || 
|-id=185 bgcolor=#E9E9E9
| 430185 ||  || — || October 8, 2004 || Kitt Peak || Spacewatch || — || align=right | 2.3 km || 
|-id=186 bgcolor=#E9E9E9
| 430186 ||  || — || September 14, 1999 || Kitt Peak || Spacewatch || — || align=right | 2.3 km || 
|-id=187 bgcolor=#E9E9E9
| 430187 ||  || — || October 10, 1996 || Kitt Peak || Spacewatch || (5) || align=right data-sort-value="0.79" | 790 m || 
|-id=188 bgcolor=#E9E9E9
| 430188 ||  || — || November 6, 2005 || Kitt Peak || Spacewatch || — || align=right | 1.7 km || 
|-id=189 bgcolor=#fefefe
| 430189 ||  || — || March 15, 2008 || Kitt Peak || Spacewatch || — || align=right data-sort-value="0.79" | 790 m || 
|-id=190 bgcolor=#E9E9E9
| 430190 ||  || — || October 15, 2004 || Mount Lemmon || Mount Lemmon Survey || MRX || align=right | 1.1 km || 
|-id=191 bgcolor=#d6d6d6
| 430191 ||  || — || April 5, 2011 || Kitt Peak || Spacewatch || EOS || align=right | 2.2 km || 
|-id=192 bgcolor=#fefefe
| 430192 ||  || — || November 14, 2007 || Mount Lemmon || Mount Lemmon Survey || — || align=right data-sort-value="0.74" | 740 m || 
|-id=193 bgcolor=#d6d6d6
| 430193 ||  || — || March 16, 2010 || Kitt Peak || Spacewatch || — || align=right | 2.6 km || 
|-id=194 bgcolor=#E9E9E9
| 430194 ||  || — || October 5, 2004 || Kitt Peak || Spacewatch || — || align=right | 1.7 km || 
|-id=195 bgcolor=#d6d6d6
| 430195 ||  || — || October 25, 2008 || Kitt Peak || Spacewatch || — || align=right | 2.8 km || 
|-id=196 bgcolor=#E9E9E9
| 430196 ||  || — || November 16, 2009 || Kitt Peak || Spacewatch || — || align=right | 2.4 km || 
|-id=197 bgcolor=#d6d6d6
| 430197 ||  || — || October 13, 2007 || Mount Lemmon || Mount Lemmon Survey || Tj (2.99) || align=right | 2.8 km || 
|-id=198 bgcolor=#E9E9E9
| 430198 ||  || — || March 29, 2011 || Mount Lemmon || Mount Lemmon Survey || — || align=right | 2.5 km || 
|-id=199 bgcolor=#fefefe
| 430199 ||  || — || January 27, 2007 || Kitt Peak || Spacewatch || — || align=right data-sort-value="0.91" | 910 m || 
|-id=200 bgcolor=#fefefe
| 430200 ||  || — || July 28, 2009 || Kitt Peak || Spacewatch || — || align=right data-sort-value="0.92" | 920 m || 
|}

430201–430300 

|-bgcolor=#E9E9E9
| 430201 ||  || — || December 13, 2004 || Kitt Peak || Spacewatch || MRX || align=right | 1.3 km || 
|-id=202 bgcolor=#fefefe
| 430202 ||  || — || March 11, 2008 || Kitt Peak || Spacewatch || — || align=right data-sort-value="0.91" | 910 m || 
|-id=203 bgcolor=#E9E9E9
| 430203 ||  || — || May 18, 2012 || Mount Lemmon || Mount Lemmon Survey || (5) || align=right | 1.1 km || 
|-id=204 bgcolor=#E9E9E9
| 430204 ||  || — || October 22, 2005 || Kitt Peak || Spacewatch || — || align=right data-sort-value="0.74" | 740 m || 
|-id=205 bgcolor=#E9E9E9
| 430205 ||  || — || October 6, 2005 || Mount Lemmon || Mount Lemmon Survey || — || align=right data-sort-value="0.93" | 930 m || 
|-id=206 bgcolor=#E9E9E9
| 430206 ||  || — || October 9, 2004 || Kitt Peak || Spacewatch || — || align=right | 2.7 km || 
|-id=207 bgcolor=#d6d6d6
| 430207 ||  || — || April 11, 2005 || Mount Lemmon || Mount Lemmon Survey || URS || align=right | 3.1 km || 
|-id=208 bgcolor=#E9E9E9
| 430208 ||  || — || November 23, 2006 || Mount Lemmon || Mount Lemmon Survey || — || align=right | 1.1 km || 
|-id=209 bgcolor=#fefefe
| 430209 ||  || — || September 15, 1998 || Kitt Peak || Spacewatch || — || align=right data-sort-value="0.80" | 800 m || 
|-id=210 bgcolor=#E9E9E9
| 430210 ||  || — || January 23, 2006 || Kitt Peak || Spacewatch || — || align=right | 2.0 km || 
|-id=211 bgcolor=#E9E9E9
| 430211 ||  || — || January 10, 2006 || Mount Lemmon || Mount Lemmon Survey || MIS || align=right | 2.4 km || 
|-id=212 bgcolor=#d6d6d6
| 430212 ||  || — || November 19, 2008 || Mount Lemmon || Mount Lemmon Survey || — || align=right | 3.1 km || 
|-id=213 bgcolor=#E9E9E9
| 430213 ||  || — || April 5, 2003 || Kitt Peak || Spacewatch || — || align=right | 1.6 km || 
|-id=214 bgcolor=#E9E9E9
| 430214 ||  || — || November 23, 2009 || Catalina || CSS || — || align=right | 1.3 km || 
|-id=215 bgcolor=#d6d6d6
| 430215 ||  || — || November 6, 2008 || Catalina || CSS || — || align=right | 3.1 km || 
|-id=216 bgcolor=#fefefe
| 430216 ||  || — || December 1, 2006 || Mount Lemmon || Mount Lemmon Survey || — || align=right data-sort-value="0.82" | 820 m || 
|-id=217 bgcolor=#E9E9E9
| 430217 ||  || — || January 2, 1997 || Kitt Peak || Spacewatch || — || align=right | 1.5 km || 
|-id=218 bgcolor=#d6d6d6
| 430218 ||  || — || January 18, 2009 || Kitt Peak || Spacewatch || LIX || align=right | 3.8 km || 
|-id=219 bgcolor=#fefefe
| 430219 ||  || — || September 19, 2009 || Mount Lemmon || Mount Lemmon Survey || — || align=right data-sort-value="0.92" | 920 m || 
|-id=220 bgcolor=#fefefe
| 430220 ||  || — || November 22, 2005 || Catalina || CSS || H || align=right data-sort-value="0.75" | 750 m || 
|-id=221 bgcolor=#E9E9E9
| 430221 ||  || — || October 25, 2005 || Catalina || CSS || — || align=right | 1.1 km || 
|-id=222 bgcolor=#E9E9E9
| 430222 ||  || — || January 5, 2010 || Kitt Peak || Spacewatch || — || align=right | 2.7 km || 
|-id=223 bgcolor=#d6d6d6
| 430223 ||  || — || December 5, 2002 || Socorro || LINEAR || — || align=right | 3.4 km || 
|-id=224 bgcolor=#d6d6d6
| 430224 ||  || — || September 12, 2007 || Catalina || CSS || — || align=right | 3.2 km || 
|-id=225 bgcolor=#fefefe
| 430225 ||  || — || February 8, 2011 || Mount Lemmon || Mount Lemmon Survey || — || align=right data-sort-value="0.69" | 690 m || 
|-id=226 bgcolor=#d6d6d6
| 430226 ||  || — || October 1, 2008 || Catalina || CSS || — || align=right | 3.2 km || 
|-id=227 bgcolor=#d6d6d6
| 430227 ||  || — || October 11, 2007 || Mount Lemmon || Mount Lemmon Survey || — || align=right | 2.8 km || 
|-id=228 bgcolor=#E9E9E9
| 430228 ||  || — || September 17, 2004 || Anderson Mesa || LONEOS || EUN || align=right | 1.4 km || 
|-id=229 bgcolor=#E9E9E9
| 430229 ||  || — || November 17, 2009 || Mount Lemmon || Mount Lemmon Survey || — || align=right | 2.7 km || 
|-id=230 bgcolor=#E9E9E9
| 430230 ||  || — || December 5, 2005 || Kitt Peak || Spacewatch || (5) || align=right | 1.0 km || 
|-id=231 bgcolor=#d6d6d6
| 430231 ||  || — || September 11, 2007 || Mount Lemmon || Mount Lemmon Survey || — || align=right | 3.5 km || 
|-id=232 bgcolor=#fefefe
| 430232 ||  || — || July 31, 2009 || Kitt Peak || Spacewatch || V || align=right data-sort-value="0.62" | 620 m || 
|-id=233 bgcolor=#E9E9E9
| 430233 ||  || — || October 10, 2004 || Kitt Peak || Spacewatch || — || align=right | 2.4 km || 
|-id=234 bgcolor=#E9E9E9
| 430234 ||  || — || April 18, 2007 || Kitt Peak || Spacewatch || — || align=right | 2.3 km || 
|-id=235 bgcolor=#E9E9E9
| 430235 ||  || — || August 31, 2000 || Socorro || LINEAR || MAR || align=right | 1.5 km || 
|-id=236 bgcolor=#E9E9E9
| 430236 ||  || — || September 21, 2004 || Anderson Mesa || LONEOS || — || align=right | 2.1 km || 
|-id=237 bgcolor=#d6d6d6
| 430237 ||  || — || October 11, 2007 || Catalina || CSS || — || align=right | 2.5 km || 
|-id=238 bgcolor=#E9E9E9
| 430238 ||  || — || November 23, 2009 || Catalina || CSS || — || align=right | 1.3 km || 
|-id=239 bgcolor=#d6d6d6
| 430239 ||  || — || December 21, 2008 || Catalina || CSS || — || align=right | 3.6 km || 
|-id=240 bgcolor=#d6d6d6
| 430240 ||  || — || October 4, 2002 || Campo Imperatore || CINEOS || EOS || align=right | 2.1 km || 
|-id=241 bgcolor=#d6d6d6
| 430241 ||  || — || September 12, 2007 || Mount Lemmon || Mount Lemmon Survey || — || align=right | 2.3 km || 
|-id=242 bgcolor=#fefefe
| 430242 ||  || — || September 17, 2009 || Kitt Peak || Spacewatch || — || align=right data-sort-value="0.90" | 900 m || 
|-id=243 bgcolor=#d6d6d6
| 430243 ||  || — || September 10, 2007 || Kitt Peak || Spacewatch || — || align=right | 3.1 km || 
|-id=244 bgcolor=#d6d6d6
| 430244 ||  || — || October 9, 2007 || Mount Lemmon || Mount Lemmon Survey || THM || align=right | 1.9 km || 
|-id=245 bgcolor=#E9E9E9
| 430245 ||  || — || May 16, 2007 || Mount Lemmon || Mount Lemmon Survey || MAR || align=right | 1.3 km || 
|-id=246 bgcolor=#E9E9E9
| 430246 ||  || — || June 10, 2007 || Kitt Peak || Spacewatch || — || align=right | 2.7 km || 
|-id=247 bgcolor=#d6d6d6
| 430247 ||  || — || March 9, 2005 || Mount Lemmon || Mount Lemmon Survey || — || align=right | 2.5 km || 
|-id=248 bgcolor=#E9E9E9
| 430248 ||  || — || April 2, 2006 || Kitt Peak || Spacewatch || HOF || align=right | 2.4 km || 
|-id=249 bgcolor=#E9E9E9
| 430249 ||  || — || August 9, 2004 || Socorro || LINEAR || (5) || align=right data-sort-value="0.98" | 980 m || 
|-id=250 bgcolor=#E9E9E9
| 430250 ||  || — || April 26, 2011 || Mount Lemmon || Mount Lemmon Survey || — || align=right | 2.1 km || 
|-id=251 bgcolor=#E9E9E9
| 430251 ||  || — || October 10, 1999 || Socorro || LINEAR || — || align=right | 2.8 km || 
|-id=252 bgcolor=#E9E9E9
| 430252 ||  || — || March 26, 2006 || Mount Lemmon || Mount Lemmon Survey || — || align=right | 1.8 km || 
|-id=253 bgcolor=#d6d6d6
| 430253 ||  || — || May 12, 2010 || WISE || WISE || — || align=right | 3.8 km || 
|-id=254 bgcolor=#d6d6d6
| 430254 ||  || — || September 4, 2007 || Catalina || CSS || EOS || align=right | 2.5 km || 
|-id=255 bgcolor=#d6d6d6
| 430255 ||  || — || October 24, 2008 || Kitt Peak || Spacewatch || — || align=right | 2.4 km || 
|-id=256 bgcolor=#d6d6d6
| 430256 ||  || — || November 22, 2008 || Kitt Peak || Spacewatch || — || align=right | 3.4 km || 
|-id=257 bgcolor=#d6d6d6
| 430257 ||  || — || November 2, 2013 || Kitt Peak || Spacewatch || — || align=right | 3.4 km || 
|-id=258 bgcolor=#d6d6d6
| 430258 ||  || — || September 29, 2003 || Kitt Peak || Spacewatch || KOR || align=right | 1.3 km || 
|-id=259 bgcolor=#E9E9E9
| 430259 ||  || — || October 2, 2008 || Kitt Peak || Spacewatch || — || align=right | 1.8 km || 
|-id=260 bgcolor=#fefefe
| 430260 ||  || — || March 9, 2005 || Mount Lemmon || Mount Lemmon Survey || — || align=right data-sort-value="0.79" | 790 m || 
|-id=261 bgcolor=#d6d6d6
| 430261 ||  || — || December 3, 2008 || Mount Lemmon || Mount Lemmon Survey || — || align=right | 4.0 km || 
|-id=262 bgcolor=#E9E9E9
| 430262 ||  || — || April 30, 2011 || Mount Lemmon || Mount Lemmon Survey || — || align=right | 2.6 km || 
|-id=263 bgcolor=#d6d6d6
| 430263 ||  || — || October 4, 2007 || Kitt Peak || Spacewatch || — || align=right | 2.5 km || 
|-id=264 bgcolor=#d6d6d6
| 430264 ||  || — || November 3, 2008 || Mount Lemmon || Mount Lemmon Survey || — || align=right | 3.1 km || 
|-id=265 bgcolor=#d6d6d6
| 430265 ||  || — || September 13, 2007 || Mount Lemmon || Mount Lemmon Survey || — || align=right | 2.8 km || 
|-id=266 bgcolor=#E9E9E9
| 430266 ||  || — || January 22, 1998 || Kitt Peak || Spacewatch || — || align=right | 1.1 km || 
|-id=267 bgcolor=#E9E9E9
| 430267 ||  || — || December 8, 1999 || Kitt Peak || Spacewatch || — || align=right | 2.3 km || 
|-id=268 bgcolor=#d6d6d6
| 430268 ||  || — || May 22, 2011 || Mount Lemmon || Mount Lemmon Survey || — || align=right | 2.8 km || 
|-id=269 bgcolor=#E9E9E9
| 430269 ||  || — || March 26, 2010 || WISE || WISE || — || align=right | 2.9 km || 
|-id=270 bgcolor=#d6d6d6
| 430270 ||  || — || April 2, 2006 || Kitt Peak || Spacewatch || — || align=right | 3.0 km || 
|-id=271 bgcolor=#d6d6d6
| 430271 ||  || — || May 24, 2010 || WISE || WISE || — || align=right | 4.4 km || 
|-id=272 bgcolor=#d6d6d6
| 430272 ||  || — || November 19, 2003 || Socorro || LINEAR || — || align=right | 3.5 km || 
|-id=273 bgcolor=#d6d6d6
| 430273 ||  || — || January 30, 2004 || Kitt Peak || Spacewatch || — || align=right | 3.2 km || 
|-id=274 bgcolor=#d6d6d6
| 430274 ||  || — || October 25, 2008 || Catalina || CSS || — || align=right | 3.1 km || 
|-id=275 bgcolor=#E9E9E9
| 430275 ||  || — || November 10, 1993 || Kitt Peak || Spacewatch || EUN || align=right | 1.4 km || 
|-id=276 bgcolor=#d6d6d6
| 430276 ||  || — || March 27, 2004 || Kitt Peak || Spacewatch || LIX || align=right | 2.9 km || 
|-id=277 bgcolor=#d6d6d6
| 430277 ||  || — || September 20, 2007 || Catalina || CSS || — || align=right | 3.2 km || 
|-id=278 bgcolor=#E9E9E9
| 430278 ||  || — || December 30, 2005 || Catalina || CSS || EUN || align=right | 1.4 km || 
|-id=279 bgcolor=#E9E9E9
| 430279 ||  || — || December 10, 2009 || Mount Lemmon || Mount Lemmon Survey || — || align=right | 2.8 km || 
|-id=280 bgcolor=#d6d6d6
| 430280 ||  || — || October 19, 2007 || Catalina || CSS || — || align=right | 3.5 km || 
|-id=281 bgcolor=#E9E9E9
| 430281 ||  || — || August 22, 2004 || Kitt Peak || Spacewatch || (5) || align=right data-sort-value="0.84" | 840 m || 
|-id=282 bgcolor=#d6d6d6
| 430282 ||  || — || May 21, 2011 || Mount Lemmon || Mount Lemmon Survey || EOS || align=right | 2.2 km || 
|-id=283 bgcolor=#E9E9E9
| 430283 ||  || — || November 9, 2009 || Catalina || CSS || — || align=right | 1.2 km || 
|-id=284 bgcolor=#E9E9E9
| 430284 ||  || — || November 27, 2009 || Mount Lemmon || Mount Lemmon Survey || — || align=right | 2.1 km || 
|-id=285 bgcolor=#d6d6d6
| 430285 ||  || — || February 18, 2010 || Kitt Peak || Spacewatch || — || align=right | 3.6 km || 
|-id=286 bgcolor=#E9E9E9
| 430286 ||  || — || November 23, 2009 || Catalina || CSS || — || align=right | 1.8 km || 
|-id=287 bgcolor=#E9E9E9
| 430287 ||  || — || March 25, 2007 || Mount Lemmon || Mount Lemmon Survey || — || align=right | 1.5 km || 
|-id=288 bgcolor=#E9E9E9
| 430288 ||  || — || November 20, 2009 || Kitt Peak || Spacewatch || — || align=right | 1.2 km || 
|-id=289 bgcolor=#E9E9E9
| 430289 ||  || — || November 21, 2009 || Catalina || CSS || — || align=right | 1.4 km || 
|-id=290 bgcolor=#d6d6d6
| 430290 ||  || — || October 27, 2008 || Kitt Peak || Spacewatch || — || align=right | 2.4 km || 
|-id=291 bgcolor=#E9E9E9
| 430291 ||  || — || October 9, 2004 || Kitt Peak || Spacewatch || — || align=right | 1.4 km || 
|-id=292 bgcolor=#E9E9E9
| 430292 ||  || — || September 24, 2000 || Socorro || LINEAR || (5) || align=right | 1.0 km || 
|-id=293 bgcolor=#E9E9E9
| 430293 ||  || — || October 9, 2008 || Mount Lemmon || Mount Lemmon Survey || — || align=right | 2.3 km || 
|-id=294 bgcolor=#d6d6d6
| 430294 ||  || — || March 25, 2010 || Mount Lemmon || Mount Lemmon Survey || — || align=right | 3.4 km || 
|-id=295 bgcolor=#E9E9E9
| 430295 ||  || — || September 28, 2008 || Catalina || CSS || — || align=right | 2.3 km || 
|-id=296 bgcolor=#d6d6d6
| 430296 ||  || — || December 5, 2008 || Kitt Peak || Spacewatch || — || align=right | 2.5 km || 
|-id=297 bgcolor=#E9E9E9
| 430297 ||  || — || May 31, 2008 || Mount Lemmon || Mount Lemmon Survey || — || align=right | 1.0 km || 
|-id=298 bgcolor=#d6d6d6
| 430298 ||  || — || September 12, 2007 || Catalina || CSS || — || align=right | 3.4 km || 
|-id=299 bgcolor=#E9E9E9
| 430299 ||  || — || December 27, 2005 || Kitt Peak || Spacewatch || (5) || align=right data-sort-value="0.97" | 970 m || 
|-id=300 bgcolor=#d6d6d6
| 430300 ||  || — || January 15, 2010 || WISE || WISE || — || align=right | 4.7 km || 
|}

430301–430400 

|-bgcolor=#E9E9E9
| 430301 ||  || — || October 10, 2008 || Mount Lemmon || Mount Lemmon Survey || — || align=right | 2.0 km || 
|-id=302 bgcolor=#E9E9E9
| 430302 ||  || — || September 24, 2008 || Mount Lemmon || Mount Lemmon Survey || — || align=right | 2.4 km || 
|-id=303 bgcolor=#E9E9E9
| 430303 ||  || — || March 26, 2011 || Kitt Peak || Spacewatch || EUN || align=right | 1.4 km || 
|-id=304 bgcolor=#E9E9E9
| 430304 ||  || — || November 4, 2004 || Kitt Peak || Spacewatch || — || align=right | 2.0 km || 
|-id=305 bgcolor=#FA8072
| 430305 ||  || — || December 28, 2005 || Kitt Peak || Spacewatch || — || align=right | 1.7 km || 
|-id=306 bgcolor=#d6d6d6
| 430306 ||  || — || May 29, 2012 || Mount Lemmon || Mount Lemmon Survey || — || align=right | 4.0 km || 
|-id=307 bgcolor=#E9E9E9
| 430307 ||  || — || December 30, 2005 || Kitt Peak || Spacewatch || — || align=right | 1.2 km || 
|-id=308 bgcolor=#d6d6d6
| 430308 ||  || — || January 29, 2009 || Mount Lemmon || Mount Lemmon Survey || — || align=right | 4.1 km || 
|-id=309 bgcolor=#d6d6d6
| 430309 ||  || — || November 2, 2013 || Mount Lemmon || Mount Lemmon Survey || 7:4 || align=right | 4.1 km || 
|-id=310 bgcolor=#E9E9E9
| 430310 ||  || — || November 6, 2008 || Mount Lemmon || Mount Lemmon Survey || AGN || align=right | 1.3 km || 
|-id=311 bgcolor=#d6d6d6
| 430311 ||  || — || September 10, 2007 || Kitt Peak || Spacewatch || — || align=right | 2.9 km || 
|-id=312 bgcolor=#C2FFFF
| 430312 ||  || — || November 2, 2010 || Mount Lemmon || Mount Lemmon Survey || L4 || align=right | 8.3 km || 
|-id=313 bgcolor=#fefefe
| 430313 ||  || — || October 4, 2006 || Mount Lemmon || Mount Lemmon Survey || V || align=right data-sort-value="0.57" | 570 m || 
|-id=314 bgcolor=#E9E9E9
| 430314 ||  || — || September 24, 1960 || Palomar || PLS || — || align=right | 1.2 km || 
|-id=315 bgcolor=#d6d6d6
| 430315 ||  || — || November 20, 2008 || Mount Lemmon || Mount Lemmon Survey || Tj (2.96) || align=right | 4.0 km || 
|-id=316 bgcolor=#d6d6d6
| 430316 ||  || — || July 18, 2007 || Mount Lemmon || Mount Lemmon Survey || KOR || align=right | 1.4 km || 
|-id=317 bgcolor=#E9E9E9
| 430317 ||  || — || October 1, 2008 || Mount Lemmon || Mount Lemmon Survey || — || align=right | 2.0 km || 
|-id=318 bgcolor=#d6d6d6
| 430318 ||  || — || February 13, 2010 || WISE || WISE || — || align=right | 3.3 km || 
|-id=319 bgcolor=#d6d6d6
| 430319 ||  || — || June 16, 2005 || Mount Lemmon || Mount Lemmon Survey || — || align=right | 3.8 km || 
|-id=320 bgcolor=#d6d6d6
| 430320 ||  || — || December 18, 2003 || Socorro || LINEAR || — || align=right | 3.0 km || 
|-id=321 bgcolor=#E9E9E9
| 430321 ||  || — || December 11, 2004 || Kitt Peak || Spacewatch || — || align=right | 2.1 km || 
|-id=322 bgcolor=#d6d6d6
| 430322 ||  || — || May 12, 2011 || Mount Lemmon || Mount Lemmon Survey || — || align=right | 3.0 km || 
|-id=323 bgcolor=#d6d6d6
| 430323 ||  || — || September 10, 2007 || Kitt Peak || Spacewatch || — || align=right | 2.7 km || 
|-id=324 bgcolor=#d6d6d6
| 430324 ||  || — || June 14, 2005 || Mount Lemmon || Mount Lemmon Survey || — || align=right | 5.0 km || 
|-id=325 bgcolor=#d6d6d6
| 430325 ||  || — || November 8, 2013 || Mount Lemmon || Mount Lemmon Survey || EOS || align=right | 2.3 km || 
|-id=326 bgcolor=#d6d6d6
| 430326 ||  || — || April 30, 2006 || Kitt Peak || Spacewatch || KOR || align=right | 1.6 km || 
|-id=327 bgcolor=#E9E9E9
| 430327 ||  || — || May 27, 2003 || Kitt Peak || Spacewatch || EUN || align=right | 1.4 km || 
|-id=328 bgcolor=#E9E9E9
| 430328 ||  || — || April 22, 2007 || Mount Lemmon || Mount Lemmon Survey || — || align=right | 1.6 km || 
|-id=329 bgcolor=#E9E9E9
| 430329 ||  || — || August 20, 2000 || Anderson Mesa || LONEOS || — || align=right | 2.1 km || 
|-id=330 bgcolor=#d6d6d6
| 430330 ||  || — || May 14, 2005 || Mount Lemmon || Mount Lemmon Survey || — || align=right | 2.8 km || 
|-id=331 bgcolor=#E9E9E9
| 430331 ||  || — || January 13, 2005 || Kitt Peak || Spacewatch || — || align=right | 3.2 km || 
|-id=332 bgcolor=#E9E9E9
| 430332 ||  || — || March 24, 2003 || Kitt Peak || Spacewatch || — || align=right | 1.1 km || 
|-id=333 bgcolor=#d6d6d6
| 430333 ||  || — || November 5, 2007 || Mount Lemmon || Mount Lemmon Survey || — || align=right | 3.5 km || 
|-id=334 bgcolor=#fefefe
| 430334 ||  || — || November 22, 2006 || Mount Lemmon || Mount Lemmon Survey || — || align=right data-sort-value="0.94" | 940 m || 
|-id=335 bgcolor=#d6d6d6
| 430335 ||  || — || November 19, 2008 || Mount Lemmon || Mount Lemmon Survey || — || align=right | 3.2 km || 
|-id=336 bgcolor=#d6d6d6
| 430336 ||  || — || February 2, 2009 || Mount Lemmon || Mount Lemmon Survey || — || align=right | 2.8 km || 
|-id=337 bgcolor=#d6d6d6
| 430337 ||  || — || January 15, 2004 || Kitt Peak || Spacewatch || EOS || align=right | 1.4 km || 
|-id=338 bgcolor=#E9E9E9
| 430338 ||  || — || December 4, 2005 || Kitt Peak || Spacewatch || (5) || align=right | 1.2 km || 
|-id=339 bgcolor=#E9E9E9
| 430339 ||  || — || October 29, 2008 || Kitt Peak || Spacewatch || — || align=right | 2.5 km || 
|-id=340 bgcolor=#d6d6d6
| 430340 ||  || — || April 6, 2010 || Catalina || CSS || — || align=right | 4.1 km || 
|-id=341 bgcolor=#E9E9E9
| 430341 ||  || — || January 20, 2001 || Socorro || LINEAR || — || align=right | 2.2 km || 
|-id=342 bgcolor=#E9E9E9
| 430342 ||  || — || August 23, 2008 || Siding Spring || SSS || — || align=right | 2.1 km || 
|-id=343 bgcolor=#fefefe
| 430343 ||  || — || December 5, 2002 || Socorro || LINEAR || V || align=right data-sort-value="0.74" | 740 m || 
|-id=344 bgcolor=#d6d6d6
| 430344 ||  || — || January 20, 2009 || Kitt Peak || Spacewatch || — || align=right | 3.1 km || 
|-id=345 bgcolor=#d6d6d6
| 430345 ||  || — || December 13, 2007 || Socorro || LINEAR || EOS || align=right | 2.2 km || 
|-id=346 bgcolor=#E9E9E9
| 430346 ||  || — || January 23, 2006 || Mount Lemmon || Mount Lemmon Survey || — || align=right data-sort-value="0.98" | 980 m || 
|-id=347 bgcolor=#d6d6d6
| 430347 ||  || — || December 9, 1996 || Kitt Peak || Spacewatch || VER || align=right | 2.7 km || 
|-id=348 bgcolor=#d6d6d6
| 430348 ||  || — || October 18, 2006 || Kitt Peak || Spacewatch || — || align=right | 3.3 km || 
|-id=349 bgcolor=#d6d6d6
| 430349 ||  || — || January 19, 2009 || Mount Lemmon || Mount Lemmon Survey || — || align=right | 2.9 km || 
|-id=350 bgcolor=#E9E9E9
| 430350 ||  || — || September 24, 2008 || Mount Lemmon || Mount Lemmon Survey || — || align=right | 2.4 km || 
|-id=351 bgcolor=#E9E9E9
| 430351 ||  || — || October 20, 2003 || Kitt Peak || Spacewatch || MRX || align=right | 1.2 km || 
|-id=352 bgcolor=#E9E9E9
| 430352 ||  || — || February 25, 2011 || Mount Lemmon || Mount Lemmon Survey || MAR || align=right | 1.2 km || 
|-id=353 bgcolor=#d6d6d6
| 430353 ||  || — || September 22, 2006 || Kitt Peak || Spacewatch || — || align=right | 4.9 km || 
|-id=354 bgcolor=#d6d6d6
| 430354 ||  || — || September 28, 2006 || Kitt Peak || Spacewatch || 7:4 || align=right | 3.8 km || 
|-id=355 bgcolor=#E9E9E9
| 430355 ||  || — || December 28, 2005 || Kitt Peak || Spacewatch || — || align=right | 1.0 km || 
|-id=356 bgcolor=#E9E9E9
| 430356 ||  || — || September 20, 2003 || Kitt Peak || Spacewatch || — || align=right | 2.7 km || 
|-id=357 bgcolor=#E9E9E9
| 430357 ||  || — || November 10, 2004 || Kitt Peak || Spacewatch || — || align=right | 2.7 km || 
|-id=358 bgcolor=#E9E9E9
| 430358 ||  || — || March 29, 2011 || Catalina || CSS || — || align=right | 1.9 km || 
|-id=359 bgcolor=#E9E9E9
| 430359 ||  || — || February 21, 2007 || Kitt Peak || Spacewatch || — || align=right | 1.2 km || 
|-id=360 bgcolor=#d6d6d6
| 430360 ||  || — || January 15, 2009 || Kitt Peak || Spacewatch || — || align=right | 3.1 km || 
|-id=361 bgcolor=#E9E9E9
| 430361 ||  || — || February 17, 2010 || Catalina || CSS || — || align=right | 2.6 km || 
|-id=362 bgcolor=#E9E9E9
| 430362 ||  || — || December 10, 2004 || Socorro || LINEAR || — || align=right | 3.4 km || 
|-id=363 bgcolor=#d6d6d6
| 430363 ||  || — || February 4, 2009 || Catalina || CSS || — || align=right | 2.8 km || 
|-id=364 bgcolor=#d6d6d6
| 430364 ||  || — || January 10, 2008 || Mount Lemmon || Mount Lemmon Survey || 7:4 || align=right | 3.3 km || 
|-id=365 bgcolor=#d6d6d6
| 430365 ||  || — || February 3, 2009 || Kitt Peak || Spacewatch || — || align=right | 4.8 km || 
|-id=366 bgcolor=#d6d6d6
| 430366 ||  || — || August 21, 2006 || Kitt Peak || Spacewatch || — || align=right | 3.3 km || 
|-id=367 bgcolor=#d6d6d6
| 430367 ||  || — || September 14, 2007 || Catalina || CSS || — || align=right | 3.0 km || 
|-id=368 bgcolor=#d6d6d6
| 430368 ||  || — || March 8, 2009 || Mount Lemmon || Mount Lemmon Survey || — || align=right | 4.0 km || 
|-id=369 bgcolor=#d6d6d6
| 430369 ||  || — || March 17, 2004 || Kitt Peak || Spacewatch || — || align=right | 2.4 km || 
|-id=370 bgcolor=#d6d6d6
| 430370 ||  || — || November 24, 2008 || Mount Lemmon || Mount Lemmon Survey || — || align=right | 3.5 km || 
|-id=371 bgcolor=#fefefe
| 430371 ||  || — || December 25, 2005 || Kitt Peak || Spacewatch || — || align=right data-sort-value="0.84" | 840 m || 
|-id=372 bgcolor=#E9E9E9
| 430372 ||  || — || November 18, 2003 || Kitt Peak || Spacewatch || — || align=right | 2.7 km || 
|-id=373 bgcolor=#C2FFFF
| 430373 ||  || — || July 29, 2008 || Kitt Peak || Spacewatch || L4 || align=right | 8.3 km || 
|-id=374 bgcolor=#d6d6d6
| 430374 ||  || — || December 17, 2007 || Kitt Peak || Spacewatch || — || align=right | 3.4 km || 
|-id=375 bgcolor=#C2FFFF
| 430375 ||  || — || January 7, 2002 || Kitt Peak || Spacewatch || L4 || align=right | 7.5 km || 
|-id=376 bgcolor=#C2FFFF
| 430376 ||  || — || September 6, 2008 || Mount Lemmon || Mount Lemmon Survey || L4 || align=right | 7.9 km || 
|-id=377 bgcolor=#d6d6d6
| 430377 ||  || — || September 25, 2006 || Catalina || CSS || — || align=right | 6.1 km || 
|-id=378 bgcolor=#d6d6d6
| 430378 ||  || — || August 29, 2005 || Kitt Peak || Spacewatch || — || align=right | 3.2 km || 
|-id=379 bgcolor=#C2FFFF
| 430379 ||  || — || September 5, 2007 || Mount Lemmon || Mount Lemmon Survey || L4 || align=right | 9.4 km || 
|-id=380 bgcolor=#fefefe
| 430380 ||  || — || October 17, 2009 || Catalina || CSS || H || align=right data-sort-value="0.90" | 900 m || 
|-id=381 bgcolor=#d6d6d6
| 430381 ||  || — || January 12, 1996 || Kitt Peak || Spacewatch || — || align=right | 3.0 km || 
|-id=382 bgcolor=#d6d6d6
| 430382 ||  || — || November 19, 2003 || Anderson Mesa || LONEOS || — || align=right | 4.7 km || 
|-id=383 bgcolor=#E9E9E9
| 430383 ||  || — || December 11, 2006 || Kitt Peak || Spacewatch || — || align=right | 1.6 km || 
|-id=384 bgcolor=#E9E9E9
| 430384 ||  || — || December 5, 1997 || Caussols || ODAS || — || align=right | 1.7 km || 
|-id=385 bgcolor=#E9E9E9
| 430385 ||  || — || January 17, 2007 || Kitt Peak || Spacewatch || EUN || align=right | 1.2 km || 
|-id=386 bgcolor=#d6d6d6
| 430386 ||  || — || January 18, 2005 || Kitt Peak || Spacewatch || — || align=right | 3.5 km || 
|-id=387 bgcolor=#fefefe
| 430387 ||  || — || September 21, 2003 || Anderson Mesa || LONEOS || — || align=right | 1.1 km || 
|-id=388 bgcolor=#fefefe
| 430388 ||  || — || February 4, 2006 || Kitt Peak || Spacewatch || — || align=right data-sort-value="0.69" | 690 m || 
|-id=389 bgcolor=#E9E9E9
| 430389 ||  || — || July 27, 2005 || Siding Spring || SSS || MAR || align=right | 1.5 km || 
|-id=390 bgcolor=#E9E9E9
| 430390 ||  || — || February 5, 2011 || Mount Lemmon || Mount Lemmon Survey || — || align=right | 2.7 km || 
|-id=391 bgcolor=#d6d6d6
| 430391 ||  || — || October 5, 2002 || Kitt Peak || Spacewatch || — || align=right | 2.9 km || 
|-id=392 bgcolor=#d6d6d6
| 430392 ||  || — || November 7, 2008 || Mount Lemmon || Mount Lemmon Survey || VER || align=right | 3.4 km || 
|-id=393 bgcolor=#fefefe
| 430393 ||  || — || August 27, 2006 || Kitt Peak || Spacewatch || — || align=right data-sort-value="0.72" | 720 m || 
|-id=394 bgcolor=#E9E9E9
| 430394 ||  || — || October 20, 1993 || Kitt Peak || Spacewatch || BRG || align=right | 1.4 km || 
|-id=395 bgcolor=#E9E9E9
| 430395 ||  || — || November 12, 2005 || Kitt Peak || Spacewatch || — || align=right | 1.0 km || 
|-id=396 bgcolor=#d6d6d6
| 430396 ||  || — || December 22, 2008 || Catalina || CSS || EOS || align=right | 2.8 km || 
|-id=397 bgcolor=#E9E9E9
| 430397 ||  || — || October 15, 2009 || Mount Lemmon || Mount Lemmon Survey || — || align=right | 3.4 km || 
|-id=398 bgcolor=#fefefe
| 430398 ||  || — || December 28, 2007 || Kitt Peak || Spacewatch || — || align=right data-sort-value="0.69" | 690 m || 
|-id=399 bgcolor=#E9E9E9
| 430399 ||  || — || November 2, 1999 || Kitt Peak || Spacewatch || HOF || align=right | 2.9 km || 
|-id=400 bgcolor=#fefefe
| 430400 ||  || — || January 22, 2004 || Socorro || LINEAR || — || align=right data-sort-value="0.82" | 820 m || 
|}

430401–430500 

|-bgcolor=#d6d6d6
| 430401 ||  || — || November 19, 2008 || Catalina || CSS || — || align=right | 3.8 km || 
|-id=402 bgcolor=#fefefe
| 430402 ||  || — || November 1, 2010 || Mount Lemmon || Mount Lemmon Survey || — || align=right data-sort-value="0.99" | 990 m || 
|-id=403 bgcolor=#d6d6d6
| 430403 ||  || — || February 10, 1999 || Socorro || LINEAR || — || align=right | 4.7 km || 
|-id=404 bgcolor=#d6d6d6
| 430404 ||  || — || November 27, 2009 || Mount Lemmon || Mount Lemmon Survey || — || align=right | 5.3 km || 
|-id=405 bgcolor=#d6d6d6
| 430405 ||  || — || March 8, 2005 || Catalina || CSS || — || align=right | 2.1 km || 
|-id=406 bgcolor=#E9E9E9
| 430406 ||  || — || November 5, 1994 || Kitt Peak || Spacewatch || — || align=right | 2.1 km || 
|-id=407 bgcolor=#d6d6d6
| 430407 ||  || — || March 26, 1995 || Kitt Peak || Spacewatch || EOS || align=right | 2.0 km || 
|-id=408 bgcolor=#fefefe
| 430408 ||  || — || June 29, 1995 || Kitt Peak || Spacewatch || — || align=right data-sort-value="0.87" | 870 m || 
|-id=409 bgcolor=#d6d6d6
| 430409 ||  || — || August 20, 1995 || Kitt Peak || Spacewatch || — || align=right | 2.9 km || 
|-id=410 bgcolor=#E9E9E9
| 430410 ||  || — || October 15, 1995 || Kitt Peak || Spacewatch || — || align=right | 2.2 km || 
|-id=411 bgcolor=#fefefe
| 430411 ||  || — || October 21, 1995 || Kitt Peak || Spacewatch || — || align=right data-sort-value="0.84" | 840 m || 
|-id=412 bgcolor=#d6d6d6
| 430412 ||  || — || November 23, 1995 || Kitt Peak || Spacewatch || — || align=right | 2.8 km || 
|-id=413 bgcolor=#fefefe
| 430413 ||  || — || March 11, 1996 || Kitt Peak || Spacewatch || — || align=right data-sort-value="0.63" | 630 m || 
|-id=414 bgcolor=#d6d6d6
| 430414 ||  || — || October 4, 1996 || Kitt Peak || Spacewatch || — || align=right | 3.7 km || 
|-id=415 bgcolor=#d6d6d6
| 430415 ||  || — || October 5, 1996 || Kitt Peak || Spacewatch || — || align=right | 4.7 km || 
|-id=416 bgcolor=#E9E9E9
| 430416 ||  || — || March 2, 1997 || Kitt Peak || Spacewatch || — || align=right | 1.7 km || 
|-id=417 bgcolor=#fefefe
| 430417 ||  || — || October 2, 1997 || Kitt Peak || Spacewatch || — || align=right | 1.0 km || 
|-id=418 bgcolor=#E9E9E9
| 430418 ||  || — || December 31, 1997 || Kitt Peak || Spacewatch || — || align=right | 1.6 km || 
|-id=419 bgcolor=#d6d6d6
| 430419 ||  || — || January 24, 1998 || Kitt Peak || Spacewatch || THM || align=right | 2.1 km || 
|-id=420 bgcolor=#E9E9E9
| 430420 ||  || — || September 27, 1998 || Kitt Peak || Spacewatch || — || align=right | 2.0 km || 
|-id=421 bgcolor=#fefefe
| 430421 ||  || — || October 13, 1998 || Xinglong || SCAP || H || align=right data-sort-value="0.72" | 720 m || 
|-id=422 bgcolor=#d6d6d6
| 430422 ||  || — || September 9, 1999 || Socorro || LINEAR || — || align=right | 4.2 km || 
|-id=423 bgcolor=#E9E9E9
| 430423 ||  || — || September 5, 1999 || Anderson Mesa || LONEOS || — || align=right | 2.5 km || 
|-id=424 bgcolor=#fefefe
| 430424 ||  || — || October 3, 1999 || Kitt Peak || Spacewatch || — || align=right data-sort-value="0.65" | 650 m || 
|-id=425 bgcolor=#fefefe
| 430425 ||  || — || October 10, 1999 || Kitt Peak || Spacewatch || — || align=right data-sort-value="0.74" | 740 m || 
|-id=426 bgcolor=#fefefe
| 430426 ||  || — || October 6, 1999 || Socorro || LINEAR || — || align=right data-sort-value="0.63" | 630 m || 
|-id=427 bgcolor=#fefefe
| 430427 ||  || — || October 4, 1999 || Socorro || LINEAR || — || align=right data-sort-value="0.83" | 830 m || 
|-id=428 bgcolor=#E9E9E9
| 430428 ||  || — || October 6, 1999 || Socorro || LINEAR || — || align=right | 1.7 km || 
|-id=429 bgcolor=#E9E9E9
| 430429 ||  || — || October 7, 1999 || Kitt Peak || Spacewatch || EUN || align=right | 1.6 km || 
|-id=430 bgcolor=#fefefe
| 430430 ||  || — || October 13, 1999 || Socorro || LINEAR || H || align=right data-sort-value="0.75" | 750 m || 
|-id=431 bgcolor=#fefefe
| 430431 ||  || — || October 16, 1999 || Kitt Peak || Spacewatch || — || align=right data-sort-value="0.70" | 700 m || 
|-id=432 bgcolor=#E9E9E9
| 430432 ||  || — || November 4, 1999 || Kitt Peak || Spacewatch || — || align=right | 2.0 km || 
|-id=433 bgcolor=#E9E9E9
| 430433 ||  || — || November 9, 1999 || Kitt Peak || Spacewatch || — || align=right | 2.5 km || 
|-id=434 bgcolor=#E9E9E9
| 430434 ||  || — || November 12, 1999 || Socorro || LINEAR || — || align=right | 1.8 km || 
|-id=435 bgcolor=#E9E9E9
| 430435 ||  || — || December 7, 1999 || Socorro || LINEAR || DOR || align=right | 3.1 km || 
|-id=436 bgcolor=#fefefe
| 430436 ||  || — || March 14, 2000 || Kitt Peak || Spacewatch || NYS || align=right data-sort-value="0.60" | 600 m || 
|-id=437 bgcolor=#fefefe
| 430437 ||  || — || April 5, 2000 || Socorro || LINEAR || — || align=right | 1.1 km || 
|-id=438 bgcolor=#fefefe
| 430438 ||  || — || April 5, 2000 || Kitt Peak || Spacewatch || — || align=right data-sort-value="0.79" | 790 m || 
|-id=439 bgcolor=#FFC2E0
| 430439 ||  || — || June 3, 2000 || Anderson Mesa || LONEOS || AMO || align=right data-sort-value="0.40" | 400 m || 
|-id=440 bgcolor=#FFC2E0
| 430440 ||  || — || July 21, 2000 || Socorro || LINEAR || APO +1kmPHA || align=right | 1.1 km || 
|-id=441 bgcolor=#E9E9E9
| 430441 ||  || — || August 1, 2000 || Socorro || LINEAR || — || align=right | 2.0 km || 
|-id=442 bgcolor=#E9E9E9
| 430442 ||  || — || August 2, 2000 || Socorro || LINEAR || — || align=right | 1.3 km || 
|-id=443 bgcolor=#E9E9E9
| 430443 ||  || — || August 2, 2000 || Socorro || LINEAR || — || align=right | 2.0 km || 
|-id=444 bgcolor=#E9E9E9
| 430444 ||  || — || August 28, 2000 || Socorro || LINEAR || — || align=right | 1.8 km || 
|-id=445 bgcolor=#d6d6d6
| 430445 ||  || — || August 29, 2000 || Socorro || LINEAR || — || align=right | 3.2 km || 
|-id=446 bgcolor=#d6d6d6
| 430446 ||  || — || August 31, 2000 || Socorro || LINEAR || — || align=right | 2.8 km || 
|-id=447 bgcolor=#E9E9E9
| 430447 ||  || — || September 24, 2000 || Socorro || LINEAR || — || align=right | 3.3 km || 
|-id=448 bgcolor=#E9E9E9
| 430448 ||  || — || September 23, 2000 || Socorro || LINEAR || — || align=right | 1.1 km || 
|-id=449 bgcolor=#E9E9E9
| 430449 ||  || — || September 24, 2000 || Socorro || LINEAR || (5) || align=right data-sort-value="0.89" | 890 m || 
|-id=450 bgcolor=#FA8072
| 430450 ||  || — || September 28, 2000 || Socorro || LINEAR || H || align=right data-sort-value="0.61" | 610 m || 
|-id=451 bgcolor=#fefefe
| 430451 ||  || — || October 4, 2000 || Kitt Peak || Spacewatch || H || align=right data-sort-value="0.50" | 500 m || 
|-id=452 bgcolor=#E9E9E9
| 430452 ||  || — || October 31, 2000 || Socorro || LINEAR || (5) || align=right data-sort-value="0.85" | 850 m || 
|-id=453 bgcolor=#E9E9E9
| 430453 ||  || — || October 30, 2000 || Socorro || LINEAR || — || align=right | 1.5 km || 
|-id=454 bgcolor=#fefefe
| 430454 ||  || — || November 1, 2000 || Socorro || LINEAR || H || align=right data-sort-value="0.80" | 800 m || 
|-id=455 bgcolor=#E9E9E9
| 430455 ||  || — || November 20, 2000 || Kitt Peak || Spacewatch || MAR || align=right | 1.2 km || 
|-id=456 bgcolor=#E9E9E9
| 430456 ||  || — || October 30, 2000 || Kitt Peak || Spacewatch || — || align=right | 1.6 km || 
|-id=457 bgcolor=#E9E9E9
| 430457 ||  || — || September 27, 2000 || Kitt Peak || Spacewatch || — || align=right | 2.1 km || 
|-id=458 bgcolor=#fefefe
| 430458 ||  || — || December 20, 2000 || Socorro || LINEAR || H || align=right data-sort-value="0.78" | 780 m || 
|-id=459 bgcolor=#E9E9E9
| 430459 ||  || — || February 17, 2001 || Socorro || LINEAR || — || align=right | 2.1 km || 
|-id=460 bgcolor=#E9E9E9
| 430460 ||  || — || March 15, 2001 || Prescott || P. G. Comba || — || align=right | 3.3 km || 
|-id=461 bgcolor=#fefefe
| 430461 ||  || — || March 16, 2001 || Socorro || LINEAR || — || align=right | 1.3 km || 
|-id=462 bgcolor=#fefefe
| 430462 ||  || — || August 10, 2001 || Haleakala || NEAT || — || align=right | 1.2 km || 
|-id=463 bgcolor=#fefefe
| 430463 ||  || — || August 9, 2001 || Palomar || NEAT || — || align=right | 2.2 km || 
|-id=464 bgcolor=#d6d6d6
| 430464 ||  || — || August 11, 2001 || Haleakala || NEAT || — || align=right | 4.7 km || 
|-id=465 bgcolor=#d6d6d6
| 430465 ||  || — || August 22, 2001 || Socorro || LINEAR || Tj (2.96) || align=right | 4.1 km || 
|-id=466 bgcolor=#d6d6d6
| 430466 ||  || — || August 22, 2001 || Haleakala || NEAT || — || align=right | 2.7 km || 
|-id=467 bgcolor=#d6d6d6
| 430467 ||  || — || August 16, 2001 || Socorro || LINEAR || — || align=right | 3.3 km || 
|-id=468 bgcolor=#d6d6d6
| 430468 ||  || — || August 23, 2001 || Anderson Mesa || LONEOS || — || align=right | 3.2 km || 
|-id=469 bgcolor=#fefefe
| 430469 ||  || — || September 12, 2001 || Socorro || LINEAR || NYS || align=right data-sort-value="0.76" | 760 m || 
|-id=470 bgcolor=#d6d6d6
| 430470 ||  || — || September 10, 2001 || Socorro || LINEAR || — || align=right | 3.5 km || 
|-id=471 bgcolor=#d6d6d6
| 430471 ||  || — || September 12, 2001 || Socorro || LINEAR || — || align=right | 2.9 km || 
|-id=472 bgcolor=#fefefe
| 430472 ||  || — || September 12, 2001 || Socorro || LINEAR || MAS || align=right data-sort-value="0.88" | 880 m || 
|-id=473 bgcolor=#d6d6d6
| 430473 ||  || — || September 12, 2001 || Socorro || LINEAR || — || align=right | 3.3 km || 
|-id=474 bgcolor=#E9E9E9
| 430474 ||  || — || September 16, 2001 || Socorro || LINEAR || — || align=right data-sort-value="0.97" | 970 m || 
|-id=475 bgcolor=#fefefe
| 430475 ||  || — || September 16, 2001 || Socorro || LINEAR || — || align=right | 1.3 km || 
|-id=476 bgcolor=#fefefe
| 430476 ||  || — || September 20, 2001 || Socorro || LINEAR || — || align=right data-sort-value="0.82" | 820 m || 
|-id=477 bgcolor=#d6d6d6
| 430477 ||  || — || September 20, 2001 || Socorro || LINEAR || — || align=right | 3.1 km || 
|-id=478 bgcolor=#FA8072
| 430478 ||  || — || September 20, 2001 || Socorro || LINEAR || — || align=right data-sort-value="0.75" | 750 m || 
|-id=479 bgcolor=#d6d6d6
| 430479 ||  || — || September 16, 2001 || Socorro || LINEAR || — || align=right | 3.8 km || 
|-id=480 bgcolor=#d6d6d6
| 430480 ||  || — || September 19, 2001 || Socorro || LINEAR || — || align=right | 3.5 km || 
|-id=481 bgcolor=#d6d6d6
| 430481 ||  || — || September 19, 2001 || Socorro || LINEAR || — || align=right | 3.7 km || 
|-id=482 bgcolor=#d6d6d6
| 430482 ||  || — || September 19, 2001 || Socorro || LINEAR || — || align=right | 3.1 km || 
|-id=483 bgcolor=#E9E9E9
| 430483 ||  || — || September 19, 2001 || Socorro || LINEAR || — || align=right data-sort-value="0.94" | 940 m || 
|-id=484 bgcolor=#fefefe
| 430484 ||  || — || September 19, 2001 || Socorro || LINEAR || MAS || align=right | 1.1 km || 
|-id=485 bgcolor=#E9E9E9
| 430485 ||  || — || September 24, 2001 || Socorro || LINEAR || — || align=right data-sort-value="0.90" | 900 m || 
|-id=486 bgcolor=#d6d6d6
| 430486 ||  || — || September 20, 2001 || Socorro || LINEAR || — || align=right | 3.4 km || 
|-id=487 bgcolor=#fefefe
| 430487 ||  || — || September 20, 2001 || Socorro || LINEAR || — || align=right data-sort-value="0.90" | 900 m || 
|-id=488 bgcolor=#d6d6d6
| 430488 ||  || — || October 14, 2001 || Socorro || LINEAR || — || align=right | 4.8 km || 
|-id=489 bgcolor=#d6d6d6
| 430489 ||  || — || September 10, 2001 || Socorro || LINEAR || — || align=right | 3.8 km || 
|-id=490 bgcolor=#E9E9E9
| 430490 ||  || — || September 12, 2001 || Socorro || LINEAR || — || align=right | 1.3 km || 
|-id=491 bgcolor=#d6d6d6
| 430491 ||  || — || September 18, 2001 || Kitt Peak || Spacewatch || — || align=right | 4.1 km || 
|-id=492 bgcolor=#d6d6d6
| 430492 ||  || — || October 14, 2001 || Socorro || LINEAR || — || align=right | 2.7 km || 
|-id=493 bgcolor=#fefefe
| 430493 ||  || — || October 11, 2001 || Palomar || NEAT || MAS || align=right data-sort-value="0.68" | 680 m || 
|-id=494 bgcolor=#d6d6d6
| 430494 ||  || — || October 14, 2001 || Socorro || LINEAR || Tj (2.95) || align=right | 3.8 km || 
|-id=495 bgcolor=#fefefe
| 430495 ||  || — || October 14, 2001 || Palomar || NEAT || — || align=right | 3.0 km || 
|-id=496 bgcolor=#d6d6d6
| 430496 ||  || — || October 11, 2001 || Palomar || NEAT || — || align=right | 3.1 km || 
|-id=497 bgcolor=#d6d6d6
| 430497 ||  || — || October 16, 2001 || Socorro || LINEAR || HYG || align=right | 3.0 km || 
|-id=498 bgcolor=#d6d6d6
| 430498 ||  || — || October 17, 2001 || Socorro || LINEAR || — || align=right | 3.0 km || 
|-id=499 bgcolor=#fefefe
| 430499 ||  || — || October 17, 2001 || Socorro || LINEAR || — || align=right | 1.1 km || 
|-id=500 bgcolor=#d6d6d6
| 430500 ||  || — || October 15, 2001 || Kitt Peak || Spacewatch || — || align=right | 2.8 km || 
|}

430501–430600 

|-bgcolor=#fefefe
| 430501 ||  || — || October 17, 2001 || Kitt Peak || Spacewatch || — || align=right | 1.0 km || 
|-id=502 bgcolor=#fefefe
| 430502 ||  || — || October 15, 2001 || Socorro || LINEAR || NYS || align=right data-sort-value="0.80" | 800 m || 
|-id=503 bgcolor=#d6d6d6
| 430503 ||  || — || October 20, 2001 || Kitt Peak || Spacewatch || — || align=right | 2.9 km || 
|-id=504 bgcolor=#d6d6d6
| 430504 ||  || — || October 18, 2001 || Palomar || NEAT || — || align=right | 3.2 km || 
|-id=505 bgcolor=#d6d6d6
| 430505 ||  || — || October 25, 2001 || Kitt Peak || Spacewatch || EOS || align=right | 1.9 km || 
|-id=506 bgcolor=#d6d6d6
| 430506 ||  || — || September 18, 2001 || Anderson Mesa || LONEOS || EOS || align=right | 2.0 km || 
|-id=507 bgcolor=#E9E9E9
| 430507 ||  || — || October 23, 2001 || Socorro || LINEAR || MAR || align=right data-sort-value="0.93" | 930 m || 
|-id=508 bgcolor=#E9E9E9
| 430508 ||  || — || September 10, 2001 || Socorro || LINEAR || — || align=right data-sort-value="0.88" | 880 m || 
|-id=509 bgcolor=#fefefe
| 430509 ||  || — || November 11, 2001 || Apache Point || SDSS || — || align=right | 1.1 km || 
|-id=510 bgcolor=#fefefe
| 430510 ||  || — || November 19, 2001 || Socorro || LINEAR || H || align=right data-sort-value="0.74" | 740 m || 
|-id=511 bgcolor=#E9E9E9
| 430511 ||  || — || November 26, 2001 || Socorro || LINEAR || — || align=right | 2.0 km || 
|-id=512 bgcolor=#E9E9E9
| 430512 ||  || — || November 17, 2001 || Socorro || LINEAR || — || align=right data-sort-value="0.87" | 870 m || 
|-id=513 bgcolor=#d6d6d6
| 430513 ||  || — || November 18, 2001 || Socorro || LINEAR || Tj (2.97) || align=right | 3.9 km || 
|-id=514 bgcolor=#E9E9E9
| 430514 ||  || — || December 9, 2001 || Socorro || LINEAR || — || align=right | 1.3 km || 
|-id=515 bgcolor=#E9E9E9
| 430515 ||  || — || December 10, 2001 || Socorro || LINEAR || — || align=right | 1.2 km || 
|-id=516 bgcolor=#E9E9E9
| 430516 ||  || — || December 13, 2001 || Socorro || LINEAR || (5) || align=right data-sort-value="0.75" | 750 m || 
|-id=517 bgcolor=#E9E9E9
| 430517 ||  || — || December 14, 2001 || Socorro || LINEAR || BRG || align=right | 1.7 km || 
|-id=518 bgcolor=#fefefe
| 430518 ||  || — || December 18, 2001 || Socorro || LINEAR || — || align=right data-sort-value="0.55" | 550 m || 
|-id=519 bgcolor=#d6d6d6
| 430519 ||  || — || December 18, 2001 || Kitt Peak || Spacewatch || — || align=right | 4.8 km || 
|-id=520 bgcolor=#E9E9E9
| 430520 ||  || — || December 23, 2001 || Socorro || LINEAR || MAR || align=right | 1.3 km || 
|-id=521 bgcolor=#E9E9E9
| 430521 ||  || — || December 23, 2001 || Socorro || LINEAR || — || align=right | 1.2 km || 
|-id=522 bgcolor=#E9E9E9
| 430522 ||  || — || January 8, 2002 || Socorro || LINEAR || — || align=right | 1.4 km || 
|-id=523 bgcolor=#E9E9E9
| 430523 ||  || — || January 15, 2002 || Kingsnake || J. V. McClusky || — || align=right | 1.5 km || 
|-id=524 bgcolor=#E9E9E9
| 430524 ||  || — || January 14, 2002 || Socorro || LINEAR || — || align=right | 1.2 km || 
|-id=525 bgcolor=#E9E9E9
| 430525 ||  || — || January 19, 2002 || Socorro || LINEAR || — || align=right | 2.0 km || 
|-id=526 bgcolor=#E9E9E9
| 430526 ||  || — || January 23, 2002 || Socorro || LINEAR || — || align=right | 1.8 km || 
|-id=527 bgcolor=#E9E9E9
| 430527 ||  || — || January 9, 2002 || Socorro || LINEAR || — || align=right | 1.8 km || 
|-id=528 bgcolor=#fefefe
| 430528 ||  || — || February 7, 2002 || Socorro || LINEAR || H || align=right data-sort-value="0.54" | 540 m || 
|-id=529 bgcolor=#E9E9E9
| 430529 ||  || — || February 10, 2002 || Desert Eagle || W. K. Y. Yeung || — || align=right | 1.7 km || 
|-id=530 bgcolor=#E9E9E9
| 430530 ||  || — || February 7, 2002 || Socorro || LINEAR || — || align=right | 2.0 km || 
|-id=531 bgcolor=#E9E9E9
| 430531 ||  || — || January 19, 2002 || Kitt Peak || Spacewatch || — || align=right | 2.1 km || 
|-id=532 bgcolor=#E9E9E9
| 430532 ||  || — || February 10, 2002 || Socorro || LINEAR || — || align=right | 1.9 km || 
|-id=533 bgcolor=#E9E9E9
| 430533 ||  || — || February 11, 2002 || Socorro || LINEAR || ADE || align=right | 2.3 km || 
|-id=534 bgcolor=#E9E9E9
| 430534 ||  || — || February 8, 2002 || Kitt Peak || Spacewatch || — || align=right | 1.2 km || 
|-id=535 bgcolor=#fefefe
| 430535 ||  || — || February 10, 2002 || Socorro || LINEAR || H || align=right data-sort-value="0.73" | 730 m || 
|-id=536 bgcolor=#E9E9E9
| 430536 ||  || — || April 20, 1998 || Socorro || LINEAR || — || align=right | 1.8 km || 
|-id=537 bgcolor=#E9E9E9
| 430537 ||  || — || March 13, 2002 || Socorro || LINEAR || EUN || align=right | 1.5 km || 
|-id=538 bgcolor=#E9E9E9
| 430538 ||  || — || March 9, 2002 || Palomar || NEAT || — || align=right | 1.4 km || 
|-id=539 bgcolor=#E9E9E9
| 430539 ||  || — || March 12, 2002 || Kitt Peak || Spacewatch || — || align=right | 1.6 km || 
|-id=540 bgcolor=#fefefe
| 430540 ||  || — || March 12, 2002 || Palomar || NEAT || — || align=right data-sort-value="0.74" | 740 m || 
|-id=541 bgcolor=#fefefe
| 430541 ||  || — || March 13, 2002 || Kitt Peak || Spacewatch || — || align=right data-sort-value="0.68" | 680 m || 
|-id=542 bgcolor=#E9E9E9
| 430542 ||  || — || March 9, 2002 || Anderson Mesa || LONEOS || — || align=right | 1.4 km || 
|-id=543 bgcolor=#E9E9E9
| 430543 ||  || — || February 22, 2002 || Socorro || LINEAR || — || align=right | 1.9 km || 
|-id=544 bgcolor=#FFC2E0
| 430544 ||  || — || April 4, 2002 || Palomar || NEAT || APOPHAcritical || align=right data-sort-value="0.68" | 680 m || 
|-id=545 bgcolor=#fefefe
| 430545 ||  || — || April 2, 2002 || Kitt Peak || Spacewatch || H || align=right data-sort-value="0.60" | 600 m || 
|-id=546 bgcolor=#E9E9E9
| 430546 ||  || — || April 4, 2002 || Palomar || NEAT || ADE || align=right | 2.2 km || 
|-id=547 bgcolor=#E9E9E9
| 430547 ||  || — || April 8, 2002 || Kitt Peak || Spacewatch || — || align=right | 1.3 km || 
|-id=548 bgcolor=#E9E9E9
| 430548 ||  || — || April 12, 2002 || Socorro || LINEAR || — || align=right | 1.6 km || 
|-id=549 bgcolor=#E9E9E9
| 430549 ||  || — || April 12, 2002 || Socorro || LINEAR || — || align=right | 3.1 km || 
|-id=550 bgcolor=#E9E9E9
| 430550 ||  || — || April 12, 2002 || Socorro || LINEAR || — || align=right | 1.7 km || 
|-id=551 bgcolor=#FA8072
| 430551 ||  || — || April 10, 2002 || Socorro || LINEAR || — || align=right data-sort-value="0.57" | 570 m || 
|-id=552 bgcolor=#FFC2E0
| 430552 ||  || — || April 22, 2002 || Socorro || LINEAR || AMO +1kmcritical || align=right data-sort-value="0.93" | 930 m || 
|-id=553 bgcolor=#fefefe
| 430553 ||  || — || May 6, 2002 || Socorro || LINEAR || H || align=right data-sort-value="0.84" | 840 m || 
|-id=554 bgcolor=#E9E9E9
| 430554 ||  || — || May 9, 2002 || Socorro || LINEAR || — || align=right | 2.2 km || 
|-id=555 bgcolor=#fefefe
| 430555 ||  || — || May 9, 2002 || Socorro || LINEAR || H || align=right data-sort-value="0.87" | 870 m || 
|-id=556 bgcolor=#E9E9E9
| 430556 ||  || — || May 11, 2002 || Socorro || LINEAR || — || align=right | 1.5 km || 
|-id=557 bgcolor=#E9E9E9
| 430557 ||  || — || May 4, 2002 || Palomar || NEAT || — || align=right | 2.8 km || 
|-id=558 bgcolor=#E9E9E9
| 430558 ||  || — || May 30, 2002 || Palomar || NEAT || — || align=right | 1.9 km || 
|-id=559 bgcolor=#FA8072
| 430559 ||  || — || June 13, 2002 || Palomar || NEAT || — || align=right data-sort-value="0.78" | 780 m || 
|-id=560 bgcolor=#FA8072
| 430560 ||  || — || July 13, 2002 || Socorro || LINEAR || — || align=right | 1.5 km || 
|-id=561 bgcolor=#fefefe
| 430561 ||  || — || July 14, 2002 || Socorro || LINEAR || — || align=right data-sort-value="0.82" | 820 m || 
|-id=562 bgcolor=#fefefe
| 430562 ||  || — || July 8, 2002 || Palomar || NEAT || — || align=right data-sort-value="0.77" | 770 m || 
|-id=563 bgcolor=#E9E9E9
| 430563 ||  || — || July 14, 2002 || Palomar || NEAT || — || align=right | 1.9 km || 
|-id=564 bgcolor=#E9E9E9
| 430564 ||  || — || August 6, 2002 || Palomar || NEAT || — || align=right | 3.0 km || 
|-id=565 bgcolor=#E9E9E9
| 430565 ||  || — || August 12, 2002 || Socorro || LINEAR || — || align=right | 2.3 km || 
|-id=566 bgcolor=#E9E9E9
| 430566 ||  || — || August 8, 2002 || Palomar || S. F. Hönig || DOR || align=right | 2.8 km || 
|-id=567 bgcolor=#fefefe
| 430567 ||  || — || August 11, 2002 || Haleakala || NEAT || — || align=right data-sort-value="0.94" | 940 m || 
|-id=568 bgcolor=#fefefe
| 430568 ||  || — || August 11, 2002 || Palomar || NEAT || — || align=right data-sort-value="0.59" | 590 m || 
|-id=569 bgcolor=#d6d6d6
| 430569 ||  || — || August 8, 2002 || Palomar || NEAT || — || align=right | 2.4 km || 
|-id=570 bgcolor=#fefefe
| 430570 ||  || — || August 30, 2002 || Palomar || NEAT || — || align=right data-sort-value="0.81" | 810 m || 
|-id=571 bgcolor=#E9E9E9
| 430571 ||  || — || August 16, 2002 || Palomar || A. Lowe || — || align=right | 3.1 km || 
|-id=572 bgcolor=#fefefe
| 430572 ||  || — || August 29, 2002 || Palomar || S. F. Hönig || NYS || align=right data-sort-value="0.64" | 640 m || 
|-id=573 bgcolor=#fefefe
| 430573 ||  || — || August 29, 2002 || Palomar || S. F. Hönig || — || align=right data-sort-value="0.77" | 770 m || 
|-id=574 bgcolor=#d6d6d6
| 430574 ||  || — || August 18, 2002 || Palomar || NEAT || — || align=right | 2.5 km || 
|-id=575 bgcolor=#fefefe
| 430575 ||  || — || August 27, 2002 || Palomar || NEAT || — || align=right data-sort-value="0.78" | 780 m || 
|-id=576 bgcolor=#fefefe
| 430576 ||  || — || August 17, 2002 || Palomar || NEAT || MAS || align=right data-sort-value="0.79" | 790 m || 
|-id=577 bgcolor=#fefefe
| 430577 ||  || — || August 30, 2002 || Palomar || NEAT || — || align=right data-sort-value="0.73" | 730 m || 
|-id=578 bgcolor=#E9E9E9
| 430578 ||  || — || August 16, 2002 || Palomar || NEAT || DOR || align=right | 2.7 km || 
|-id=579 bgcolor=#fefefe
| 430579 ||  || — || August 17, 2002 || Palomar || NEAT || NYS || align=right data-sort-value="0.60" | 600 m || 
|-id=580 bgcolor=#fefefe
| 430580 ||  || — || August 17, 2002 || Palomar || NEAT || — || align=right data-sort-value="0.73" | 730 m || 
|-id=581 bgcolor=#d6d6d6
| 430581 ||  || — || August 29, 2002 || Palomar || NEAT || KOR || align=right | 1.5 km || 
|-id=582 bgcolor=#fefefe
| 430582 ||  || — || August 29, 2002 || Palomar || NEAT || — || align=right data-sort-value="0.90" | 900 m || 
|-id=583 bgcolor=#fefefe
| 430583 ||  || — || August 30, 2002 || Palomar || NEAT || — || align=right data-sort-value="0.68" | 680 m || 
|-id=584 bgcolor=#E9E9E9
| 430584 ||  || — || August 30, 2002 || Palomar || NEAT || DOR || align=right | 2.3 km || 
|-id=585 bgcolor=#E9E9E9
| 430585 ||  || — || August 17, 2002 || Palomar || NEAT ||  || align=right | 2.5 km || 
|-id=586 bgcolor=#fefefe
| 430586 ||  || — || September 6, 2002 || Socorro || LINEAR || — || align=right data-sort-value="0.98" | 980 m || 
|-id=587 bgcolor=#FA8072
| 430587 ||  || — || September 13, 2002 || Palomar || NEAT || — || align=right data-sort-value="0.43" | 430 m || 
|-id=588 bgcolor=#fefefe
| 430588 ||  || — || September 13, 2002 || Palomar || NEAT || — || align=right data-sort-value="0.71" | 710 m || 
|-id=589 bgcolor=#d6d6d6
| 430589 ||  || — || September 14, 2002 || Palomar || NEAT || — || align=right | 2.5 km || 
|-id=590 bgcolor=#fefefe
| 430590 ||  || — || September 12, 2002 || Palomar || NEAT || — || align=right data-sort-value="0.75" | 750 m || 
|-id=591 bgcolor=#E9E9E9
| 430591 ||  || — || September 27, 2002 || Palomar || NEAT || — || align=right | 2.7 km || 
|-id=592 bgcolor=#FA8072
| 430592 ||  || — || August 14, 2002 || Socorro || LINEAR || — || align=right data-sort-value="0.90" | 900 m || 
|-id=593 bgcolor=#d6d6d6
| 430593 ||  || — || September 30, 2002 || Socorro || LINEAR || — || align=right | 2.3 km || 
|-id=594 bgcolor=#fefefe
| 430594 ||  || — || September 7, 2002 || Socorro || LINEAR || NYS || align=right data-sort-value="0.71" | 710 m || 
|-id=595 bgcolor=#fefefe
| 430595 ||  || — || August 12, 2002 || Socorro || LINEAR || — || align=right | 1.0 km || 
|-id=596 bgcolor=#E9E9E9
| 430596 ||  || — || September 17, 2002 || Palomar || NEAT || — || align=right | 2.2 km || 
|-id=597 bgcolor=#d6d6d6
| 430597 ||  || — || September 26, 2002 || Palomar || NEAT || EOS || align=right | 1.9 km || 
|-id=598 bgcolor=#fefefe
| 430598 ||  || — || September 26, 1995 || Kitt Peak || Spacewatch || — || align=right data-sort-value="0.68" | 680 m || 
|-id=599 bgcolor=#E9E9E9
| 430599 ||  || — || October 2, 2002 || Socorro || LINEAR || — || align=right | 3.0 km || 
|-id=600 bgcolor=#d6d6d6
| 430600 ||  || — || September 7, 2002 || Socorro || LINEAR || — || align=right | 3.3 km || 
|}

430601–430700 

|-bgcolor=#FA8072
| 430601 ||  || — || October 4, 2002 || Socorro || LINEAR || — || align=right | 1.0 km || 
|-id=602 bgcolor=#fefefe
| 430602 ||  || — || January 30, 2000 || Kitt Peak || Spacewatch || V || align=right data-sort-value="0.49" | 490 m || 
|-id=603 bgcolor=#d6d6d6
| 430603 ||  || — || October 5, 2002 || Apache Point || SDSS || — || align=right | 2.8 km || 
|-id=604 bgcolor=#d6d6d6
| 430604 ||  || — || October 10, 2002 || Apache Point || SDSS || — || align=right | 2.6 km || 
|-id=605 bgcolor=#d6d6d6
| 430605 ||  || — || October 10, 2002 || Apache Point || SDSS || — || align=right | 2.5 km || 
|-id=606 bgcolor=#d6d6d6
| 430606 ||  || — || October 29, 2002 || Apache Point || SDSS || — || align=right | 2.3 km || 
|-id=607 bgcolor=#fefefe
| 430607 ||  || — || October 18, 2002 || Palomar || NEAT || — || align=right data-sort-value="0.87" | 870 m || 
|-id=608 bgcolor=#fefefe
| 430608 ||  || — || November 4, 2002 || Palomar || NEAT || — || align=right data-sort-value="0.78" | 780 m || 
|-id=609 bgcolor=#d6d6d6
| 430609 ||  || — || November 23, 2002 || Palomar || NEAT || — || align=right | 2.2 km || 
|-id=610 bgcolor=#d6d6d6
| 430610 ||  || — || November 7, 2002 || Kitt Peak || Spacewatch || — || align=right | 2.9 km || 
|-id=611 bgcolor=#d6d6d6
| 430611 ||  || — || November 24, 2002 || Palomar || S. F. Hönig || EOS || align=right | 1.7 km || 
|-id=612 bgcolor=#d6d6d6
| 430612 ||  || — || November 25, 2002 || Palomar || NEAT || — || align=right | 3.1 km || 
|-id=613 bgcolor=#fefefe
| 430613 ||  || — || November 24, 2002 || Palomar || NEAT || — || align=right | 1.0 km || 
|-id=614 bgcolor=#d6d6d6
| 430614 ||  || — || December 10, 2002 || Socorro || LINEAR || — || align=right | 3.1 km || 
|-id=615 bgcolor=#d6d6d6
| 430615 ||  || — || December 10, 2002 || Palomar || NEAT || LIX || align=right | 4.1 km || 
|-id=616 bgcolor=#d6d6d6
| 430616 ||  || — || December 28, 2002 || Socorro || LINEAR || Tj (2.97) || align=right | 3.9 km || 
|-id=617 bgcolor=#E9E9E9
| 430617 ||  || — || January 24, 2003 || Palomar || NEAT || — || align=right | 1.2 km || 
|-id=618 bgcolor=#d6d6d6
| 430618 ||  || — || January 26, 2003 || Anderson Mesa || LONEOS || — || align=right | 3.0 km || 
|-id=619 bgcolor=#d6d6d6
| 430619 ||  || — || February 1, 2003 || Socorro || LINEAR || — || align=right | 4.5 km || 
|-id=620 bgcolor=#d6d6d6
| 430620 ||  || — || February 22, 2003 || Palomar || NEAT || — || align=right | 3.5 km || 
|-id=621 bgcolor=#d6d6d6
| 430621 ||  || — || March 6, 2003 || Anderson Mesa || LONEOS || — || align=right | 3.2 km || 
|-id=622 bgcolor=#d6d6d6
| 430622 ||  || — || March 11, 2003 || Palomar || NEAT || — || align=right | 3.5 km || 
|-id=623 bgcolor=#C2FFFF
| 430623 ||  || — || March 26, 2003 || Kitt Peak || Spacewatch || L4 || align=right | 8.7 km || 
|-id=624 bgcolor=#E9E9E9
| 430624 ||  || — || April 7, 2003 || Kitt Peak || Spacewatch || — || align=right data-sort-value="0.80" | 800 m || 
|-id=625 bgcolor=#E9E9E9
| 430625 ||  || — || April 8, 2003 || Haleakala || NEAT || — || align=right | 3.4 km || 
|-id=626 bgcolor=#E9E9E9
| 430626 ||  || — || August 5, 2003 || Socorro || LINEAR || JUN || align=right | 1.2 km || 
|-id=627 bgcolor=#fefefe
| 430627 ||  || — || August 20, 2003 || Palomar || NEAT || — || align=right data-sort-value="0.92" | 920 m || 
|-id=628 bgcolor=#E9E9E9
| 430628 ||  || — || August 20, 2003 || Campo Imperatore || CINEOS || — || align=right | 1.0 km || 
|-id=629 bgcolor=#E9E9E9
| 430629 ||  || — || August 23, 2003 || Kleť || Kleť Obs. || — || align=right | 2.0 km || 
|-id=630 bgcolor=#fefefe
| 430630 ||  || — || August 23, 2003 || Palomar || NEAT || — || align=right data-sort-value="0.72" | 720 m || 
|-id=631 bgcolor=#E9E9E9
| 430631 ||  || — || August 24, 2003 || Socorro || LINEAR || EUN || align=right | 1.2 km || 
|-id=632 bgcolor=#E9E9E9
| 430632 ||  || — || August 24, 2003 || Socorro || LINEAR || — || align=right | 1.9 km || 
|-id=633 bgcolor=#fefefe
| 430633 ||  || — || August 26, 2003 || Črni Vrh || Črni Vrh || — || align=right | 1.1 km || 
|-id=634 bgcolor=#FA8072
| 430634 ||  || — || September 3, 2003 || Bergisch Gladbach || W. Bickel || — || align=right data-sort-value="0.75" | 750 m || 
|-id=635 bgcolor=#E9E9E9
| 430635 ||  || — || September 15, 2003 || Anderson Mesa || LONEOS || — || align=right data-sort-value="0.98" | 980 m || 
|-id=636 bgcolor=#E9E9E9
| 430636 ||  || — || September 18, 2003 || Palomar || NEAT || JUN || align=right | 1.2 km || 
|-id=637 bgcolor=#fefefe
| 430637 ||  || — || September 18, 2003 || Palomar || NEAT || — || align=right data-sort-value="0.79" | 790 m || 
|-id=638 bgcolor=#E9E9E9
| 430638 ||  || — || August 26, 2003 || Socorro || LINEAR || — || align=right | 2.7 km || 
|-id=639 bgcolor=#fefefe
| 430639 ||  || — || September 18, 2003 || Campo Imperatore || CINEOS || H || align=right data-sort-value="0.81" | 810 m || 
|-id=640 bgcolor=#E9E9E9
| 430640 ||  || — || September 17, 2003 || Kitt Peak || Spacewatch || — || align=right | 1.8 km || 
|-id=641 bgcolor=#E9E9E9
| 430641 ||  || — || September 17, 2003 || Kitt Peak || Spacewatch || HOF || align=right | 2.3 km || 
|-id=642 bgcolor=#E9E9E9
| 430642 ||  || — || August 25, 2003 || Socorro || LINEAR || EUN || align=right | 1.5 km || 
|-id=643 bgcolor=#E9E9E9
| 430643 ||  || — || September 20, 2003 || Palomar || NEAT || — || align=right | 3.4 km || 
|-id=644 bgcolor=#fefefe
| 430644 ||  || — || September 19, 2003 || Kitt Peak || Spacewatch || — || align=right data-sort-value="0.69" | 690 m || 
|-id=645 bgcolor=#E9E9E9
| 430645 ||  || — || September 19, 2003 || Campo Imperatore || CINEOS || — || align=right | 2.4 km || 
|-id=646 bgcolor=#E9E9E9
| 430646 ||  || — || September 18, 2003 || Anderson Mesa || LONEOS || — || align=right | 2.7 km || 
|-id=647 bgcolor=#E9E9E9
| 430647 ||  || — || September 18, 2003 || Kitt Peak || Spacewatch || — || align=right | 2.2 km || 
|-id=648 bgcolor=#E9E9E9
| 430648 ||  || — || September 22, 2003 || Anderson Mesa || LONEOS || — || align=right | 2.1 km || 
|-id=649 bgcolor=#E9E9E9
| 430649 ||  || — || August 28, 2003 || Socorro || LINEAR || GEF || align=right | 1.4 km || 
|-id=650 bgcolor=#E9E9E9
| 430650 ||  || — || September 16, 2003 || Kitt Peak || Spacewatch || — || align=right | 2.3 km || 
|-id=651 bgcolor=#E9E9E9
| 430651 ||  || — || September 27, 2003 || Kitt Peak || Spacewatch || — || align=right | 1.7 km || 
|-id=652 bgcolor=#E9E9E9
| 430652 ||  || — || August 25, 2003 || Socorro || LINEAR || — || align=right | 1.9 km || 
|-id=653 bgcolor=#E9E9E9
| 430653 ||  || — || September 16, 2003 || Kitt Peak || Spacewatch || — || align=right | 2.4 km || 
|-id=654 bgcolor=#E9E9E9
| 430654 ||  || — || September 4, 2003 || Socorro || LINEAR || — || align=right | 3.2 km || 
|-id=655 bgcolor=#fefefe
| 430655 ||  || — || September 18, 2003 || Palomar || NEAT || H || align=right data-sort-value="0.72" | 720 m || 
|-id=656 bgcolor=#E9E9E9
| 430656 ||  || — || September 26, 2003 || Apache Point || SDSS || AST || align=right | 1.4 km || 
|-id=657 bgcolor=#E9E9E9
| 430657 ||  || — || September 24, 2003 || Palomar || NEAT || — || align=right | 2.8 km || 
|-id=658 bgcolor=#d6d6d6
| 430658 ||  || — || September 18, 2003 || Kitt Peak || Spacewatch || BRA || align=right | 1.3 km || 
|-id=659 bgcolor=#E9E9E9
| 430659 ||  || — || September 21, 2003 || Kitt Peak || Spacewatch || EUN || align=right | 1.1 km || 
|-id=660 bgcolor=#fefefe
| 430660 ||  || — || September 22, 2003 || Kitt Peak || Spacewatch || — || align=right data-sort-value="0.61" | 610 m || 
|-id=661 bgcolor=#E9E9E9
| 430661 ||  || — || September 26, 2003 || Apache Point || SDSS || — || align=right | 1.8 km || 
|-id=662 bgcolor=#E9E9E9
| 430662 ||  || — || September 29, 2003 || Apache Point || SDSS || — || align=right | 2.7 km || 
|-id=663 bgcolor=#FA8072
| 430663 ||  || — || October 16, 2003 || Anderson Mesa || LONEOS || — || align=right | 1.1 km || 
|-id=664 bgcolor=#fefefe
| 430664 ||  || — || September 21, 2003 || Anderson Mesa || LONEOS || H || align=right data-sort-value="0.81" | 810 m || 
|-id=665 bgcolor=#fefefe
| 430665 ||  || — || October 17, 2003 || Anderson Mesa || LONEOS || — || align=right data-sort-value="0.74" | 740 m || 
|-id=666 bgcolor=#E9E9E9
| 430666 ||  || — || September 20, 2003 || Anderson Mesa || LONEOS || JUN || align=right | 1.3 km || 
|-id=667 bgcolor=#E9E9E9
| 430667 ||  || — || October 21, 2003 || Kitt Peak || Spacewatch || — || align=right | 2.2 km || 
|-id=668 bgcolor=#E9E9E9
| 430668 ||  || — || October 21, 2003 || Anderson Mesa || LONEOS || — || align=right | 2.7 km || 
|-id=669 bgcolor=#d6d6d6
| 430669 ||  || — || October 24, 2003 || Socorro || LINEAR || BRA || align=right | 1.8 km || 
|-id=670 bgcolor=#E9E9E9
| 430670 ||  || — || October 19, 2003 || Kitt Peak || Spacewatch || DOR || align=right | 2.9 km || 
|-id=671 bgcolor=#E9E9E9
| 430671 ||  || — || October 16, 2003 || Kitt Peak || Spacewatch || — || align=right | 2.6 km || 
|-id=672 bgcolor=#E9E9E9
| 430672 ||  || — || October 17, 2003 || Apache Point || SDSS || — || align=right | 1.6 km || 
|-id=673 bgcolor=#E9E9E9
| 430673 ||  || — || October 17, 2003 || Apache Point || SDSS || — || align=right | 1.9 km || 
|-id=674 bgcolor=#E9E9E9
| 430674 ||  || — || October 18, 2003 || Apache Point || SDSS || — || align=right | 1.8 km || 
|-id=675 bgcolor=#E9E9E9
| 430675 ||  || — || October 19, 2003 || Apache Point || SDSS || — || align=right | 2.1 km || 
|-id=676 bgcolor=#fefefe
| 430676 ||  || — || November 3, 2003 || Socorro || LINEAR || H || align=right | 1.1 km || 
|-id=677 bgcolor=#E9E9E9
| 430677 ||  || — || November 15, 2003 || Kitt Peak || Spacewatch || — || align=right | 2.4 km || 
|-id=678 bgcolor=#fefefe
| 430678 ||  || — || November 15, 2003 || Palomar || NEAT || H || align=right data-sort-value="0.85" | 850 m || 
|-id=679 bgcolor=#fefefe
| 430679 ||  || — || November 18, 2003 || Palomar || NEAT || H || align=right data-sort-value="0.94" | 940 m || 
|-id=680 bgcolor=#fefefe
| 430680 ||  || — || November 19, 2003 || Kitt Peak || Spacewatch || — || align=right data-sort-value="0.62" | 620 m || 
|-id=681 bgcolor=#d6d6d6
| 430681 ||  || — || October 25, 2003 || Socorro || LINEAR || — || align=right | 2.6 km || 
|-id=682 bgcolor=#fefefe
| 430682 ||  || — || October 5, 2003 || Socorro || LINEAR || — || align=right data-sort-value="0.88" | 880 m || 
|-id=683 bgcolor=#fefefe
| 430683 ||  || — || November 19, 2003 || Anderson Mesa || LONEOS || — || align=right | 1.0 km || 
|-id=684 bgcolor=#fefefe
| 430684 ||  || — || November 19, 2003 || Anderson Mesa || LONEOS || — || align=right data-sort-value="0.69" | 690 m || 
|-id=685 bgcolor=#d6d6d6
| 430685 ||  || — || November 20, 2003 || Socorro || LINEAR || BRA || align=right | 1.7 km || 
|-id=686 bgcolor=#fefefe
| 430686 ||  || — || October 18, 2003 || Kitt Peak || Spacewatch || — || align=right data-sort-value="0.72" | 720 m || 
|-id=687 bgcolor=#fefefe
| 430687 ||  || — || November 15, 2003 || Kitt Peak || Spacewatch || — || align=right data-sort-value="0.73" | 730 m || 
|-id=688 bgcolor=#fefefe
| 430688 ||  || — || November 30, 2003 || Nogales || Tenagra II Obs. || H || align=right data-sort-value="0.71" | 710 m || 
|-id=689 bgcolor=#d6d6d6
| 430689 ||  || — || December 5, 2003 || Nogales || M. Schwartz, P. R. Holvorcem || — || align=right | 2.6 km || 
|-id=690 bgcolor=#d6d6d6
| 430690 ||  || — || December 1, 2003 || Kitt Peak || Spacewatch || — || align=right | 1.8 km || 
|-id=691 bgcolor=#FA8072
| 430691 ||  || — || December 21, 2003 || Kitt Peak || Spacewatch || H || align=right data-sort-value="0.77" | 770 m || 
|-id=692 bgcolor=#d6d6d6
| 430692 ||  || — || December 18, 2003 || Socorro || LINEAR || — || align=right | 1.9 km || 
|-id=693 bgcolor=#fefefe
| 430693 ||  || — || December 19, 2003 || Kitt Peak || Spacewatch || — || align=right | 1.0 km || 
|-id=694 bgcolor=#d6d6d6
| 430694 ||  || — || December 19, 2003 || Kitt Peak || Spacewatch || — || align=right | 2.9 km || 
|-id=695 bgcolor=#fefefe
| 430695 ||  || — || December 17, 2003 || Socorro || LINEAR || H || align=right data-sort-value="0.93" | 930 m || 
|-id=696 bgcolor=#fefefe
| 430696 ||  || — || January 16, 2004 || Kitt Peak || Spacewatch || — || align=right data-sort-value="0.68" | 680 m || 
|-id=697 bgcolor=#d6d6d6
| 430697 ||  || — || January 23, 2004 || Socorro || LINEAR || — || align=right | 2.9 km || 
|-id=698 bgcolor=#fefefe
| 430698 ||  || — || January 23, 2004 || Anderson Mesa || LONEOS || — || align=right | 1.5 km || 
|-id=699 bgcolor=#fefefe
| 430699 ||  || — || January 19, 2004 || Kitt Peak || Spacewatch || ERI || align=right | 1.4 km || 
|-id=700 bgcolor=#fefefe
| 430700 ||  || — || January 19, 2004 || Kitt Peak || Spacewatch || — || align=right data-sort-value="0.67" | 670 m || 
|}

430701–430800 

|-bgcolor=#d6d6d6
| 430701 ||  || — || January 22, 2004 || Socorro || LINEAR || — || align=right | 3.3 km || 
|-id=702 bgcolor=#fefefe
| 430702 ||  || — || February 10, 2004 || Palomar || NEAT || — || align=right data-sort-value="0.89" | 890 m || 
|-id=703 bgcolor=#d6d6d6
| 430703 ||  || — || February 11, 2004 || Kitt Peak || Spacewatch || BRA || align=right | 1.7 km || 
|-id=704 bgcolor=#d6d6d6
| 430704 ||  || — || February 12, 2004 || Goodricke-Pigott || Goodricke-Pigott Obs. || — || align=right | 3.9 km || 
|-id=705 bgcolor=#d6d6d6
| 430705 ||  || — || February 14, 2004 || Haleakala || NEAT || — || align=right | 3.8 km || 
|-id=706 bgcolor=#fefefe
| 430706 ||  || — || February 12, 2004 || Kitt Peak || Spacewatch || — || align=right data-sort-value="0.71" | 710 m || 
|-id=707 bgcolor=#fefefe
| 430707 ||  || — || February 19, 2004 || Socorro || LINEAR || — || align=right data-sort-value="0.76" | 760 m || 
|-id=708 bgcolor=#fefefe
| 430708 ||  || — || February 22, 2004 || Kitt Peak || Spacewatch || — || align=right data-sort-value="0.62" | 620 m || 
|-id=709 bgcolor=#fefefe
| 430709 ||  || — || February 22, 2004 || Kitt Peak || Spacewatch || — || align=right data-sort-value="0.65" | 650 m || 
|-id=710 bgcolor=#d6d6d6
| 430710 ||  || — || February 23, 2004 || Socorro || LINEAR || — || align=right | 2.9 km || 
|-id=711 bgcolor=#fefefe
| 430711 ||  || — || March 10, 2004 || Palomar || NEAT || H || align=right data-sort-value="0.65" | 650 m || 
|-id=712 bgcolor=#d6d6d6
| 430712 ||  || — || March 11, 2004 || Palomar || NEAT || — || align=right | 3.7 km || 
|-id=713 bgcolor=#FA8072
| 430713 ||  || — || March 14, 2004 || Socorro || LINEAR || — || align=right data-sort-value="0.38" | 380 m || 
|-id=714 bgcolor=#d6d6d6
| 430714 ||  || — || February 17, 2004 || Socorro || LINEAR || — || align=right | 3.1 km || 
|-id=715 bgcolor=#d6d6d6
| 430715 ||  || — || March 14, 2004 || Kitt Peak || Spacewatch || — || align=right | 2.4 km || 
|-id=716 bgcolor=#fefefe
| 430716 ||  || — || March 12, 2004 || Palomar || NEAT || — || align=right data-sort-value="0.76" | 760 m || 
|-id=717 bgcolor=#fefefe
| 430717 ||  || — || February 15, 2004 || Catalina || CSS || — || align=right data-sort-value="0.89" | 890 m || 
|-id=718 bgcolor=#d6d6d6
| 430718 ||  || — || March 15, 2004 || Socorro || LINEAR || — || align=right | 3.5 km || 
|-id=719 bgcolor=#fefefe
| 430719 ||  || — || March 14, 2004 || Socorro || LINEAR || H || align=right data-sort-value="0.70" | 700 m || 
|-id=720 bgcolor=#fefefe
| 430720 ||  || — || March 15, 2004 || Catalina || CSS || — || align=right data-sort-value="0.75" | 750 m || 
|-id=721 bgcolor=#d6d6d6
| 430721 ||  || — || March 15, 2004 || Kitt Peak || Spacewatch || — || align=right | 4.0 km || 
|-id=722 bgcolor=#fefefe
| 430722 ||  || — || March 18, 2004 || Socorro || LINEAR || — || align=right | 1.2 km || 
|-id=723 bgcolor=#fefefe
| 430723 ||  || — || March 18, 2004 || Socorro || LINEAR || H || align=right data-sort-value="0.62" | 620 m || 
|-id=724 bgcolor=#fefefe
| 430724 ||  || — || March 18, 2004 || Socorro || LINEAR || — || align=right data-sort-value="0.87" | 870 m || 
|-id=725 bgcolor=#d6d6d6
| 430725 ||  || — || March 19, 2004 || Socorro || LINEAR || — || align=right | 2.7 km || 
|-id=726 bgcolor=#d6d6d6
| 430726 ||  || — || March 18, 2004 || Socorro || LINEAR || — || align=right | 2.7 km || 
|-id=727 bgcolor=#d6d6d6
| 430727 ||  || — || February 29, 2004 || Kitt Peak || Spacewatch || — || align=right | 3.5 km || 
|-id=728 bgcolor=#fefefe
| 430728 ||  || — || March 23, 2004 || Kitt Peak || Spacewatch || — || align=right data-sort-value="0.77" | 770 m || 
|-id=729 bgcolor=#d6d6d6
| 430729 ||  || — || March 22, 2004 || Anderson Mesa || LONEOS || — || align=right | 4.2 km || 
|-id=730 bgcolor=#fefefe
| 430730 ||  || — || April 12, 2004 || Socorro || LINEAR || H || align=right | 1.1 km || 
|-id=731 bgcolor=#fefefe
| 430731 ||  || — || April 12, 2004 || Kitt Peak || Spacewatch || — || align=right data-sort-value="0.92" | 920 m || 
|-id=732 bgcolor=#fefefe
| 430732 ||  || — || April 13, 2004 || Palomar || NEAT || — || align=right | 1.0 km || 
|-id=733 bgcolor=#d6d6d6
| 430733 ||  || — || April 13, 2004 || Kitt Peak || Spacewatch || — || align=right | 4.6 km || 
|-id=734 bgcolor=#fefefe
| 430734 ||  || — || April 12, 2004 || Kitt Peak || Spacewatch || NYS || align=right data-sort-value="0.59" | 590 m || 
|-id=735 bgcolor=#fefefe
| 430735 ||  || — || April 12, 2004 || Kitt Peak || Spacewatch || — || align=right data-sort-value="0.86" | 860 m || 
|-id=736 bgcolor=#d6d6d6
| 430736 ||  || — || April 14, 2004 || Kitt Peak || Spacewatch || — || align=right | 2.3 km || 
|-id=737 bgcolor=#d6d6d6
| 430737 ||  || — || April 15, 2004 || Socorro || LINEAR || — || align=right | 3.7 km || 
|-id=738 bgcolor=#C2FFFF
| 430738 ||  || — || April 16, 2004 || Kitt Peak || Spacewatch || L4 || align=right | 10 km || 
|-id=739 bgcolor=#fefefe
| 430739 ||  || — || April 19, 2004 || Socorro || LINEAR || — || align=right | 1.0 km || 
|-id=740 bgcolor=#d6d6d6
| 430740 ||  || — || April 22, 2004 || Catalina || CSS || — || align=right | 2.9 km || 
|-id=741 bgcolor=#d6d6d6
| 430741 ||  || — || April 25, 2004 || Anderson Mesa || LONEOS || Tj (2.97) || align=right | 3.5 km || 
|-id=742 bgcolor=#fefefe
| 430742 ||  || — || April 25, 2004 || Anderson Mesa || LONEOS || — || align=right | 1.2 km || 
|-id=743 bgcolor=#d6d6d6
| 430743 ||  || — || May 15, 2004 || Campo Imperatore || CINEOS || — || align=right | 4.1 km || 
|-id=744 bgcolor=#d6d6d6
| 430744 ||  || — || May 14, 2004 || Kitt Peak || Spacewatch || — || align=right | 2.7 km || 
|-id=745 bgcolor=#fefefe
| 430745 ||  || — || May 18, 2004 || Socorro || LINEAR || — || align=right data-sort-value="0.87" | 870 m || 
|-id=746 bgcolor=#d6d6d6
| 430746 ||  || — || June 10, 2004 || Socorro || LINEAR || — || align=right | 2.7 km || 
|-id=747 bgcolor=#fefefe
| 430747 ||  || — || July 7, 2004 || Campo Imperatore || CINEOS || — || align=right | 1.1 km || 
|-id=748 bgcolor=#E9E9E9
| 430748 ||  || — || June 30, 2004 || Siding Spring || SSS || — || align=right | 1.5 km || 
|-id=749 bgcolor=#E9E9E9
| 430749 ||  || — || July 13, 2004 || Siding Spring || SSS || — || align=right | 1.4 km || 
|-id=750 bgcolor=#E9E9E9
| 430750 ||  || — || August 7, 2004 || Palomar || NEAT || — || align=right data-sort-value="0.98" | 980 m || 
|-id=751 bgcolor=#E9E9E9
| 430751 ||  || — || June 16, 2004 || Kitt Peak || Spacewatch || — || align=right | 1.3 km || 
|-id=752 bgcolor=#E9E9E9
| 430752 ||  || — || August 9, 2004 || Reedy Creek || J. Broughton || — || align=right | 1.3 km || 
|-id=753 bgcolor=#E9E9E9
| 430753 ||  || — || August 5, 2004 || Palomar || NEAT || — || align=right | 1.8 km || 
|-id=754 bgcolor=#E9E9E9
| 430754 ||  || — || August 22, 2004 || Reedy Creek || J. Broughton || EUN || align=right | 1.4 km || 
|-id=755 bgcolor=#E9E9E9
| 430755 ||  || — || September 7, 2004 || Kitt Peak || Spacewatch || — || align=right | 1.8 km || 
|-id=756 bgcolor=#E9E9E9
| 430756 ||  || — || September 7, 2004 || Kitt Peak || Spacewatch || critical || align=right | 1.6 km || 
|-id=757 bgcolor=#E9E9E9
| 430757 ||  || — || September 8, 2004 || Socorro || LINEAR || — || align=right | 1.0 km || 
|-id=758 bgcolor=#E9E9E9
| 430758 ||  || — || August 11, 2004 || Socorro || LINEAR || (1547) || align=right | 1.8 km || 
|-id=759 bgcolor=#E9E9E9
| 430759 ||  || — || September 8, 2004 || Socorro || LINEAR || — || align=right | 1.7 km || 
|-id=760 bgcolor=#E9E9E9
| 430760 ||  || — || September 8, 2004 || Socorro || LINEAR || — || align=right | 2.9 km || 
|-id=761 bgcolor=#E9E9E9
| 430761 ||  || — || August 25, 2004 || Kitt Peak || Spacewatch || — || align=right | 2.3 km || 
|-id=762 bgcolor=#E9E9E9
| 430762 ||  || — || September 7, 2004 || Palomar || NEAT || — || align=right | 1.1 km || 
|-id=763 bgcolor=#E9E9E9
| 430763 ||  || — || September 9, 2004 || Socorro || LINEAR || MAR || align=right | 1.2 km || 
|-id=764 bgcolor=#E9E9E9
| 430764 ||  || — || September 10, 2004 || Socorro || LINEAR || — || align=right | 1.1 km || 
|-id=765 bgcolor=#E9E9E9
| 430765 ||  || — || September 10, 2004 || Socorro || LINEAR || ADE || align=right | 1.8 km || 
|-id=766 bgcolor=#E9E9E9
| 430766 ||  || — || September 10, 2004 || Socorro || LINEAR || — || align=right | 1.7 km || 
|-id=767 bgcolor=#E9E9E9
| 430767 ||  || — || September 10, 2004 || Kitt Peak || Spacewatch || — || align=right | 1.4 km || 
|-id=768 bgcolor=#E9E9E9
| 430768 ||  || — || September 11, 2004 || Socorro || LINEAR || — || align=right | 1.2 km || 
|-id=769 bgcolor=#E9E9E9
| 430769 ||  || — || September 12, 2004 || Socorro || LINEAR || — || align=right | 2.9 km || 
|-id=770 bgcolor=#E9E9E9
| 430770 ||  || — || September 14, 2004 || Socorro || LINEAR || EUN || align=right | 1.2 km || 
|-id=771 bgcolor=#E9E9E9
| 430771 ||  || — || September 13, 2004 || Kitt Peak || Spacewatch || — || align=right | 1.3 km || 
|-id=772 bgcolor=#E9E9E9
| 430772 ||  || — || September 11, 2004 || Kitt Peak || Spacewatch || WIT || align=right data-sort-value="0.89" | 890 m || 
|-id=773 bgcolor=#E9E9E9
| 430773 ||  || — || September 11, 2004 || Kitt Peak || Spacewatch || — || align=right | 2.0 km || 
|-id=774 bgcolor=#E9E9E9
| 430774 ||  || — || September 11, 2004 || Socorro || LINEAR || — || align=right | 2.6 km || 
|-id=775 bgcolor=#E9E9E9
| 430775 ||  || — || September 17, 2004 || Socorro || LINEAR || — || align=right | 1.1 km || 
|-id=776 bgcolor=#E9E9E9
| 430776 ||  || — || August 12, 2004 || Socorro || LINEAR || — || align=right | 2.0 km || 
|-id=777 bgcolor=#FA8072
| 430777 ||  || — || October 7, 2004 || Socorro || LINEAR || — || align=right data-sort-value="0.89" | 890 m || 
|-id=778 bgcolor=#E9E9E9
| 430778 ||  || — || September 9, 2004 || Socorro || LINEAR || — || align=right | 1.7 km || 
|-id=779 bgcolor=#E9E9E9
| 430779 ||  || — || October 5, 2004 || Kitt Peak || Spacewatch || — || align=right | 2.1 km || 
|-id=780 bgcolor=#E9E9E9
| 430780 ||  || — || October 6, 2004 || Palomar || NEAT || — || align=right | 1.7 km || 
|-id=781 bgcolor=#E9E9E9
| 430781 ||  || — || October 7, 2004 || Kitt Peak || Spacewatch || EUN || align=right | 1.3 km || 
|-id=782 bgcolor=#E9E9E9
| 430782 ||  || — || October 6, 2004 || Palomar || NEAT || ADE || align=right | 2.1 km || 
|-id=783 bgcolor=#E9E9E9
| 430783 ||  || — || October 7, 2004 || Socorro || LINEAR || — || align=right | 1.8 km || 
|-id=784 bgcolor=#E9E9E9
| 430784 ||  || — || October 8, 2004 || Socorro || LINEAR || (1547) || align=right | 2.4 km || 
|-id=785 bgcolor=#E9E9E9
| 430785 ||  || — || October 7, 2004 || Kitt Peak || Spacewatch || — || align=right | 2.1 km || 
|-id=786 bgcolor=#E9E9E9
| 430786 ||  || — || October 7, 2004 || Kitt Peak || Spacewatch || — || align=right | 1.3 km || 
|-id=787 bgcolor=#E9E9E9
| 430787 ||  || — || October 9, 2004 || Kitt Peak || Spacewatch || — || align=right | 1.2 km || 
|-id=788 bgcolor=#E9E9E9
| 430788 ||  || — || October 10, 2004 || Socorro || LINEAR || — || align=right | 2.7 km || 
|-id=789 bgcolor=#E9E9E9
| 430789 ||  || — || October 10, 2004 || Kitt Peak || Spacewatch || — || align=right | 3.1 km || 
|-id=790 bgcolor=#E9E9E9
| 430790 ||  || — || October 10, 2004 || Socorro || LINEAR || — || align=right | 1.7 km || 
|-id=791 bgcolor=#fefefe
| 430791 ||  || — || October 10, 2004 || Kitt Peak || Spacewatch || — || align=right data-sort-value="0.53" | 530 m || 
|-id=792 bgcolor=#E9E9E9
| 430792 ||  || — || October 10, 2004 || Socorro || LINEAR || — || align=right | 2.7 km || 
|-id=793 bgcolor=#E9E9E9
| 430793 ||  || — || October 4, 2004 || Palomar || NEAT || — || align=right | 1.2 km || 
|-id=794 bgcolor=#E9E9E9
| 430794 ||  || — || November 2, 2004 || Anderson Mesa || LONEOS || — || align=right | 1.7 km || 
|-id=795 bgcolor=#E9E9E9
| 430795 ||  || — || October 15, 2004 || Mount Lemmon || Mount Lemmon Survey || — || align=right | 2.6 km || 
|-id=796 bgcolor=#E9E9E9
| 430796 ||  || — || November 4, 2004 || Kitt Peak || Spacewatch || — || align=right | 1.4 km || 
|-id=797 bgcolor=#E9E9E9
| 430797 ||  || — || October 15, 2004 || Kitt Peak || Spacewatch || — || align=right | 1.4 km || 
|-id=798 bgcolor=#E9E9E9
| 430798 ||  || — || October 23, 2004 || Kitt Peak || Spacewatch || — || align=right | 1.3 km || 
|-id=799 bgcolor=#E9E9E9
| 430799 ||  || — || November 4, 2004 || Catalina || CSS || — || align=right | 2.7 km || 
|-id=800 bgcolor=#E9E9E9
| 430800 ||  || — || October 15, 2004 || Mount Lemmon || Mount Lemmon Survey || — || align=right | 3.1 km || 
|}

430801–430900 

|-bgcolor=#E9E9E9
| 430801 ||  || — || October 23, 2004 || Kitt Peak || Spacewatch || — || align=right | 1.6 km || 
|-id=802 bgcolor=#FFC2E0
| 430802 ||  || — || December 7, 2004 || Socorro || LINEAR || AMO || align=right data-sort-value="0.23" | 230 m || 
|-id=803 bgcolor=#E9E9E9
| 430803 ||  || — || December 8, 2004 || Socorro || LINEAR || — || align=right | 2.8 km || 
|-id=804 bgcolor=#FFC2E0
| 430804 ||  || — || January 9, 2005 || Catalina || CSS || APO +1kmPHA || align=right data-sort-value="0.93" | 930 m || 
|-id=805 bgcolor=#E9E9E9
| 430805 ||  || — || December 20, 2004 || Mount Lemmon || Mount Lemmon Survey || — || align=right | 1.7 km || 
|-id=806 bgcolor=#E9E9E9
| 430806 ||  || — || January 17, 2005 || Kitt Peak || Spacewatch || GEF || align=right | 1.4 km || 
|-id=807 bgcolor=#E9E9E9
| 430807 ||  || — || February 1, 2005 || Kitt Peak || Spacewatch || — || align=right | 1.9 km || 
|-id=808 bgcolor=#fefefe
| 430808 ||  || — || February 9, 2005 || Mount Lemmon || Mount Lemmon Survey || — || align=right data-sort-value="0.58" | 580 m || 
|-id=809 bgcolor=#d6d6d6
| 430809 ||  || — || March 2, 2005 || Catalina || CSS || — || align=right | 2.3 km || 
|-id=810 bgcolor=#E9E9E9
| 430810 ||  || — || March 4, 2005 || Mount Lemmon || Mount Lemmon Survey || — || align=right | 2.9 km || 
|-id=811 bgcolor=#d6d6d6
| 430811 ||  || — || March 8, 2005 || Kitt Peak || Spacewatch || — || align=right | 3.1 km || 
|-id=812 bgcolor=#d6d6d6
| 430812 ||  || — || March 9, 2005 || Mount Lemmon || Mount Lemmon Survey || — || align=right | 2.1 km || 
|-id=813 bgcolor=#d6d6d6
| 430813 ||  || — || March 11, 2005 || Kitt Peak || Spacewatch || — || align=right | 2.1 km || 
|-id=814 bgcolor=#FA8072
| 430814 ||  || — || March 10, 2005 || Mount Lemmon || Mount Lemmon Survey || H || align=right data-sort-value="0.43" | 430 m || 
|-id=815 bgcolor=#fefefe
| 430815 ||  || — || March 4, 2005 || Catalina || CSS || H || align=right data-sort-value="0.69" | 690 m || 
|-id=816 bgcolor=#d6d6d6
| 430816 ||  || — || March 11, 2005 || Mount Lemmon || Mount Lemmon Survey || — || align=right | 2.3 km || 
|-id=817 bgcolor=#d6d6d6
| 430817 ||  || — || March 11, 2005 || Mount Lemmon || Mount Lemmon Survey || — || align=right | 2.5 km || 
|-id=818 bgcolor=#d6d6d6
| 430818 ||  || — || March 17, 2005 || Kitt Peak || Spacewatch || KOR || align=right | 1.3 km || 
|-id=819 bgcolor=#fefefe
| 430819 ||  || — || April 4, 2005 || Kitt Peak || Spacewatch || — || align=right data-sort-value="0.56" | 560 m || 
|-id=820 bgcolor=#FA8072
| 430820 ||  || — || April 4, 2005 || Catalina || CSS || — || align=right data-sort-value="0.76" | 760 m || 
|-id=821 bgcolor=#d6d6d6
| 430821 ||  || — || April 5, 2005 || Mount Lemmon || Mount Lemmon Survey || — || align=right | 2.2 km || 
|-id=822 bgcolor=#d6d6d6
| 430822 ||  || — || April 6, 2005 || Mount Lemmon || Mount Lemmon Survey || — || align=right | 2.2 km || 
|-id=823 bgcolor=#d6d6d6
| 430823 ||  || — || April 10, 2005 || Kitt Peak || Spacewatch || — || align=right | 2.1 km || 
|-id=824 bgcolor=#fefefe
| 430824 ||  || — || April 11, 2005 || Kitt Peak || Spacewatch || — || align=right data-sort-value="0.66" | 660 m || 
|-id=825 bgcolor=#d6d6d6
| 430825 ||  || — || April 10, 2005 || Mount Lemmon || Mount Lemmon Survey || — || align=right | 2.7 km || 
|-id=826 bgcolor=#fefefe
| 430826 ||  || — || April 11, 2005 || Kitt Peak || M. W. Buie || — || align=right data-sort-value="0.52" | 520 m || 
|-id=827 bgcolor=#fefefe
| 430827 ||  || — || May 3, 2005 || Kitt Peak || Spacewatch || — || align=right data-sort-value="0.54" | 540 m || 
|-id=828 bgcolor=#fefefe
| 430828 ||  || — || May 6, 2005 || Mount Lemmon || Mount Lemmon Survey || — || align=right data-sort-value="0.68" | 680 m || 
|-id=829 bgcolor=#d6d6d6
| 430829 ||  || — || May 4, 2005 || Kitt Peak || Spacewatch || — || align=right | 3.3 km || 
|-id=830 bgcolor=#fefefe
| 430830 ||  || — || May 8, 2005 || Mount Lemmon || Mount Lemmon Survey || — || align=right data-sort-value="0.65" | 650 m || 
|-id=831 bgcolor=#d6d6d6
| 430831 ||  || — || May 7, 2005 || Catalina || CSS || — || align=right | 3.8 km || 
|-id=832 bgcolor=#d6d6d6
| 430832 ||  || — || May 6, 2005 || Catalina || CSS || — || align=right | 2.9 km || 
|-id=833 bgcolor=#d6d6d6
| 430833 ||  || — || May 8, 2005 || Mount Lemmon || Mount Lemmon Survey || — || align=right | 3.7 km || 
|-id=834 bgcolor=#fefefe
| 430834 ||  || — || May 3, 2005 || Kitt Peak || Spacewatch || H || align=right data-sort-value="0.75" | 750 m || 
|-id=835 bgcolor=#d6d6d6
| 430835 ||  || — || May 6, 2005 || Socorro || LINEAR || — || align=right | 3.7 km || 
|-id=836 bgcolor=#d6d6d6
| 430836 ||  || — || May 9, 2005 || Kitt Peak || Spacewatch || — || align=right | 3.8 km || 
|-id=837 bgcolor=#fefefe
| 430837 ||  || — || May 10, 2005 || Kitt Peak || Spacewatch || — || align=right data-sort-value="0.94" | 940 m || 
|-id=838 bgcolor=#d6d6d6
| 430838 ||  || — || May 10, 2005 || Mount Lemmon || Mount Lemmon Survey || — || align=right | 2.7 km || 
|-id=839 bgcolor=#C2FFFF
| 430839 ||  || — || May 10, 2005 || Kitt Peak || Spacewatch || L4 || align=right | 8.2 km || 
|-id=840 bgcolor=#fefefe
| 430840 ||  || — || May 10, 2005 || Kitt Peak || Spacewatch || — || align=right data-sort-value="0.65" | 650 m || 
|-id=841 bgcolor=#fefefe
| 430841 ||  || — || May 13, 2005 || Mount Lemmon || Mount Lemmon Survey || — || align=right data-sort-value="0.73" | 730 m || 
|-id=842 bgcolor=#E9E9E9
| 430842 ||  || — || May 20, 2005 || Palomar || NEAT || — || align=right | 1.5 km || 
|-id=843 bgcolor=#d6d6d6
| 430843 ||  || — || May 10, 2005 || Kitt Peak || Spacewatch || HYG || align=right | 2.8 km || 
|-id=844 bgcolor=#fefefe
| 430844 ||  || — || June 1, 2005 || Kitt Peak || Spacewatch || — || align=right data-sort-value="0.86" | 860 m || 
|-id=845 bgcolor=#fefefe
| 430845 ||  || — || June 4, 2005 || Kitt Peak || Spacewatch || — || align=right data-sort-value="0.85" | 850 m || 
|-id=846 bgcolor=#d6d6d6
| 430846 ||  || — || June 5, 2005 || Kitt Peak || Spacewatch || — || align=right | 3.8 km || 
|-id=847 bgcolor=#fefefe
| 430847 ||  || — || June 8, 2005 || Kitt Peak || Spacewatch || — || align=right data-sort-value="0.72" | 720 m || 
|-id=848 bgcolor=#d6d6d6
| 430848 ||  || — || June 8, 2005 || Kitt Peak || Spacewatch || — || align=right | 2.9 km || 
|-id=849 bgcolor=#d6d6d6
| 430849 ||  || — || May 16, 2005 || Mount Lemmon || Mount Lemmon Survey || — || align=right | 2.8 km || 
|-id=850 bgcolor=#d6d6d6
| 430850 ||  || — || June 13, 2005 || Mount Lemmon || Mount Lemmon Survey || — || align=right | 4.3 km || 
|-id=851 bgcolor=#C2FFFF
| 430851 ||  || — || June 11, 2005 || Kitt Peak || Spacewatch || L4 || align=right | 11 km || 
|-id=852 bgcolor=#d6d6d6
| 430852 ||  || — || June 24, 2005 || Palomar || NEAT || — || align=right | 3.3 km || 
|-id=853 bgcolor=#d6d6d6
| 430853 ||  || — || June 27, 2005 || Anderson Mesa || LONEOS || Tj (2.98) || align=right | 4.2 km || 
|-id=854 bgcolor=#fefefe
| 430854 ||  || — || June 28, 2005 || Kitt Peak || Spacewatch || — || align=right data-sort-value="0.98" | 980 m || 
|-id=855 bgcolor=#d6d6d6
| 430855 ||  || — || June 30, 2005 || Kitt Peak || Spacewatch || — || align=right | 3.2 km || 
|-id=856 bgcolor=#d6d6d6
| 430856 ||  || — || June 28, 2005 || Palomar || NEAT || — || align=right | 3.6 km || 
|-id=857 bgcolor=#d6d6d6
| 430857 ||  || — || July 2, 2005 || Kitt Peak || Spacewatch || — || align=right | 3.2 km || 
|-id=858 bgcolor=#fefefe
| 430858 ||  || — || June 6, 2005 || Kitt Peak || Spacewatch || — || align=right data-sort-value="0.94" | 940 m || 
|-id=859 bgcolor=#d6d6d6
| 430859 ||  || — || July 4, 2005 || Kitt Peak || Spacewatch || — || align=right | 4.7 km || 
|-id=860 bgcolor=#d6d6d6
| 430860 ||  || — || July 9, 2005 || Catalina || CSS || Tj (2.89) || align=right | 5.0 km || 
|-id=861 bgcolor=#fefefe
| 430861 ||  || — || July 5, 2005 || Kitt Peak || Spacewatch || critical || align=right data-sort-value="0.62" | 620 m || 
|-id=862 bgcolor=#d6d6d6
| 430862 ||  || — || July 10, 2005 || Kitt Peak || Spacewatch || — || align=right | 3.0 km || 
|-id=863 bgcolor=#fefefe
| 430863 ||  || — || July 8, 2005 || Kitt Peak || Spacewatch || — || align=right data-sort-value="0.89" | 890 m || 
|-id=864 bgcolor=#fefefe
| 430864 ||  || — || July 31, 2005 || Siding Spring || SSS || — || align=right | 1.4 km || 
|-id=865 bgcolor=#fefefe
| 430865 ||  || — || August 2, 2005 || Socorro || LINEAR || NYS || align=right data-sort-value="0.79" | 790 m || 
|-id=866 bgcolor=#fefefe
| 430866 ||  || — || August 4, 2005 || Palomar || NEAT || MAS || align=right data-sort-value="0.82" | 820 m || 
|-id=867 bgcolor=#d6d6d6
| 430867 ||  || — || August 6, 2005 || Palomar || NEAT || — || align=right | 3.2 km || 
|-id=868 bgcolor=#d6d6d6
| 430868 ||  || — || August 6, 2005 || Palomar || NEAT || — || align=right | 4.3 km || 
|-id=869 bgcolor=#fefefe
| 430869 ||  || — || August 24, 2005 || Palomar || NEAT || ERI || align=right | 1.4 km || 
|-id=870 bgcolor=#fefefe
| 430870 ||  || — || August 24, 2005 || Palomar || NEAT || NYS || align=right data-sort-value="0.56" | 560 m || 
|-id=871 bgcolor=#fefefe
| 430871 ||  || — || August 26, 2005 || Anderson Mesa || LONEOS || NYS || align=right data-sort-value="0.72" | 720 m || 
|-id=872 bgcolor=#fefefe
| 430872 ||  || — || August 27, 2005 || Kitt Peak || Spacewatch || — || align=right data-sort-value="0.93" | 930 m || 
|-id=873 bgcolor=#fefefe
| 430873 ||  || — || August 26, 2005 || Palomar || NEAT || — || align=right data-sort-value="0.91" | 910 m || 
|-id=874 bgcolor=#fefefe
| 430874 ||  || — || August 28, 2005 || Kitt Peak || Spacewatch || — || align=right | 1.9 km || 
|-id=875 bgcolor=#d6d6d6
| 430875 ||  || — || June 3, 2005 || Kitt Peak || Spacewatch || — || align=right | 4.0 km || 
|-id=876 bgcolor=#fefefe
| 430876 ||  || — || August 29, 2005 || Socorro || LINEAR || — || align=right | 3.0 km || 
|-id=877 bgcolor=#fefefe
| 430877 ||  || — || August 26, 2005 || Campo Imperatore || CINEOS || — || align=right data-sort-value="0.89" | 890 m || 
|-id=878 bgcolor=#E9E9E9
| 430878 ||  || — || August 30, 2005 || Campo Imperatore || CINEOS || — || align=right data-sort-value="0.96" | 960 m || 
|-id=879 bgcolor=#fefefe
| 430879 ||  || — || August 27, 2005 || Palomar || NEAT || NYS || align=right data-sort-value="0.61" | 610 m || 
|-id=880 bgcolor=#d6d6d6
| 430880 ||  || — || August 27, 2005 || Palomar || NEAT || — || align=right | 2.7 km || 
|-id=881 bgcolor=#fefefe
| 430881 ||  || — || August 27, 2005 || Palomar || NEAT || NYS || align=right data-sort-value="0.67" | 670 m || 
|-id=882 bgcolor=#fefefe
| 430882 ||  || — || August 27, 2005 || Palomar || NEAT || H || align=right data-sort-value="0.72" | 720 m || 
|-id=883 bgcolor=#fefefe
| 430883 ||  || — || August 27, 2005 || Palomar || NEAT || MAS || align=right data-sort-value="0.88" | 880 m || 
|-id=884 bgcolor=#d6d6d6
| 430884 ||  || — || August 30, 2005 || Campo Imperatore || CINEOS || — || align=right | 4.5 km || 
|-id=885 bgcolor=#FA8072
| 430885 ||  || — || August 30, 2005 || Socorro || LINEAR || — || align=right data-sort-value="0.77" | 770 m || 
|-id=886 bgcolor=#fefefe
| 430886 ||  || — || August 31, 2005 || Campo Imperatore || CINEOS || H || align=right data-sort-value="0.72" | 720 m || 
|-id=887 bgcolor=#d6d6d6
| 430887 ||  || — || August 26, 2005 || Palomar || NEAT || — || align=right | 2.5 km || 
|-id=888 bgcolor=#fefefe
| 430888 ||  || — || August 27, 2005 || Anderson Mesa || LONEOS || — || align=right data-sort-value="0.77" | 770 m || 
|-id=889 bgcolor=#fefefe
| 430889 ||  || — || August 27, 2005 || Palomar || NEAT || — || align=right | 1.1 km || 
|-id=890 bgcolor=#fefefe
| 430890 ||  || — || August 28, 2005 || Anderson Mesa || LONEOS || — || align=right | 1.8 km || 
|-id=891 bgcolor=#fefefe
| 430891 ||  || — || August 31, 2005 || Palomar || NEAT || — || align=right data-sort-value="0.80" | 800 m || 
|-id=892 bgcolor=#d6d6d6
| 430892 ||  || — || August 29, 2005 || Kitt Peak || Spacewatch || — || align=right | 3.2 km || 
|-id=893 bgcolor=#fefefe
| 430893 ||  || — || September 1, 2005 || Campo Imperatore || CINEOS || V || align=right data-sort-value="0.84" | 840 m || 
|-id=894 bgcolor=#fefefe
| 430894 ||  || — || September 5, 2005 || Catalina || CSS || ERI || align=right | 1.7 km || 
|-id=895 bgcolor=#E9E9E9
| 430895 ||  || — || September 1, 2005 || Campo Imperatore || CINEOS || — || align=right | 2.0 km || 
|-id=896 bgcolor=#E9E9E9
| 430896 ||  || — || September 23, 2005 || Kitt Peak || Spacewatch || ADE || align=right | 1.9 km || 
|-id=897 bgcolor=#d6d6d6
| 430897 ||  || — || September 26, 2005 || Kitt Peak || Spacewatch || 7:4 || align=right | 3.2 km || 
|-id=898 bgcolor=#d6d6d6
| 430898 ||  || — || September 26, 2005 || Kitt Peak || Spacewatch || — || align=right | 3.5 km || 
|-id=899 bgcolor=#fefefe
| 430899 ||  || — || September 1, 2005 || Kitt Peak || Spacewatch || H || align=right data-sort-value="0.87" | 870 m || 
|-id=900 bgcolor=#E9E9E9
| 430900 ||  || — || September 23, 2005 || Kitt Peak || Spacewatch || — || align=right | 1.0 km || 
|}

430901–431000 

|-bgcolor=#fefefe
| 430901 ||  || — || September 24, 2005 || Kitt Peak || Spacewatch || — || align=right data-sort-value="0.99" | 990 m || 
|-id=902 bgcolor=#fefefe
| 430902 ||  || — || September 24, 2005 || Kitt Peak || Spacewatch || fast? || align=right data-sort-value="0.86" | 860 m || 
|-id=903 bgcolor=#fefefe
| 430903 ||  || — || September 24, 2005 || Kitt Peak || Spacewatch || — || align=right | 1.0 km || 
|-id=904 bgcolor=#FA8072
| 430904 ||  || — || September 27, 2005 || Kitt Peak || Spacewatch || — || align=right | 1.3 km || 
|-id=905 bgcolor=#fefefe
| 430905 ||  || — || September 24, 2005 || Kitt Peak || Spacewatch || NYS || align=right data-sort-value="0.59" | 590 m || 
|-id=906 bgcolor=#fefefe
| 430906 ||  || — || September 29, 2005 || Mount Lemmon || Mount Lemmon Survey || — || align=right data-sort-value="0.92" | 920 m || 
|-id=907 bgcolor=#d6d6d6
| 430907 ||  || — || September 27, 2005 || Kitt Peak || Spacewatch || — || align=right | 2.8 km || 
|-id=908 bgcolor=#E9E9E9
| 430908 ||  || — || September 29, 2005 || Kitt Peak || Spacewatch || — || align=right | 1.5 km || 
|-id=909 bgcolor=#E9E9E9
| 430909 ||  || — || September 29, 2005 || Kitt Peak || Spacewatch || — || align=right | 1.0 km || 
|-id=910 bgcolor=#fefefe
| 430910 ||  || — || September 30, 2005 || Anderson Mesa || LONEOS || — || align=right data-sort-value="0.83" | 830 m || 
|-id=911 bgcolor=#fefefe
| 430911 ||  || — || September 30, 2005 || Kitt Peak || Spacewatch || — || align=right data-sort-value="0.85" | 850 m || 
|-id=912 bgcolor=#fefefe
| 430912 ||  || — || September 22, 2005 || Palomar || NEAT || — || align=right data-sort-value="0.91" | 910 m || 
|-id=913 bgcolor=#fefefe
| 430913 ||  || — || September 24, 2005 || Anderson Mesa || LONEOS || — || align=right data-sort-value="0.94" | 940 m || 
|-id=914 bgcolor=#fefefe
| 430914 ||  || — || September 30, 2005 || Anderson Mesa || LONEOS || — || align=right data-sort-value="0.87" | 870 m || 
|-id=915 bgcolor=#d6d6d6
| 430915 ||  || — || September 24, 2005 || Kitt Peak || Spacewatch || 7:4 || align=right | 3.2 km || 
|-id=916 bgcolor=#fefefe
| 430916 ||  || — || September 26, 2005 || Kitt Peak || Spacewatch || V || align=right data-sort-value="0.65" | 650 m || 
|-id=917 bgcolor=#fefefe
| 430917 ||  || — || October 3, 2005 || Catalina || CSS || — || align=right | 1.1 km || 
|-id=918 bgcolor=#fefefe
| 430918 ||  || — || October 1, 2005 || Kitt Peak || Spacewatch || — || align=right data-sort-value="0.90" | 900 m || 
|-id=919 bgcolor=#d6d6d6
| 430919 ||  || — || October 1, 2005 || Kitt Peak || Spacewatch || — || align=right | 3.6 km || 
|-id=920 bgcolor=#d6d6d6
| 430920 ||  || — || October 2, 2005 || Palomar || NEAT || — || align=right | 4.7 km || 
|-id=921 bgcolor=#fefefe
| 430921 ||  || — || October 1, 2005 || Catalina || CSS || — || align=right data-sort-value="0.87" | 870 m || 
|-id=922 bgcolor=#E9E9E9
| 430922 ||  || — || October 1, 2005 || Mount Lemmon || Mount Lemmon Survey || — || align=right | 1.3 km || 
|-id=923 bgcolor=#d6d6d6
| 430923 ||  || — || September 24, 2005 || Kitt Peak || Spacewatch || 7:4 || align=right | 4.5 km || 
|-id=924 bgcolor=#E9E9E9
| 430924 ||  || — || October 6, 2005 || Catalina || CSS || (5) || align=right data-sort-value="0.73" | 730 m || 
|-id=925 bgcolor=#fefefe
| 430925 ||  || — || October 7, 2005 || Catalina || CSS || — || align=right | 1.1 km || 
|-id=926 bgcolor=#E9E9E9
| 430926 ||  || — || October 7, 2005 || Kitt Peak || Spacewatch || — || align=right data-sort-value="0.74" | 740 m || 
|-id=927 bgcolor=#E9E9E9
| 430927 ||  || — || October 10, 2005 || Kitt Peak || Spacewatch || — || align=right data-sort-value="0.68" | 680 m || 
|-id=928 bgcolor=#fefefe
| 430928 ||  || — || October 9, 2005 || Kitt Peak || Spacewatch || NYS || align=right data-sort-value="0.76" | 760 m || 
|-id=929 bgcolor=#fefefe
| 430929 ||  || — || October 2, 2005 || Mount Lemmon || Mount Lemmon Survey || — || align=right data-sort-value="0.82" | 820 m || 
|-id=930 bgcolor=#E9E9E9
| 430930 ||  || — || October 12, 2005 || Kitt Peak || Spacewatch || — || align=right | 1.0 km || 
|-id=931 bgcolor=#E9E9E9
| 430931 ||  || — || October 24, 2005 || Kitt Peak || Spacewatch || — || align=right | 1.3 km || 
|-id=932 bgcolor=#E9E9E9
| 430932 ||  || — || October 22, 2005 || Kitt Peak || Spacewatch || — || align=right data-sort-value="0.86" | 860 m || 
|-id=933 bgcolor=#E9E9E9
| 430933 ||  || — || October 1, 2005 || Anderson Mesa || LONEOS || — || align=right | 1.5 km || 
|-id=934 bgcolor=#fefefe
| 430934 ||  || — || October 25, 2005 || Mount Lemmon || Mount Lemmon Survey || — || align=right data-sort-value="0.77" | 770 m || 
|-id=935 bgcolor=#E9E9E9
| 430935 ||  || — || October 22, 2005 || Kitt Peak || Spacewatch || — || align=right data-sort-value="0.80" | 800 m || 
|-id=936 bgcolor=#E9E9E9
| 430936 ||  || — || October 22, 2005 || Kitt Peak || Spacewatch || (5) || align=right data-sort-value="0.72" | 720 m || 
|-id=937 bgcolor=#E9E9E9
| 430937 ||  || — || October 22, 2005 || Kitt Peak || Spacewatch || — || align=right | 1.2 km || 
|-id=938 bgcolor=#E9E9E9
| 430938 ||  || — || October 24, 2005 || Kitt Peak || Spacewatch || — || align=right data-sort-value="0.75" | 750 m || 
|-id=939 bgcolor=#E9E9E9
| 430939 ||  || — || October 24, 2005 || Kitt Peak || Spacewatch || — || align=right data-sort-value="0.70" | 700 m || 
|-id=940 bgcolor=#E9E9E9
| 430940 ||  || — || October 25, 2005 || Kitt Peak || Spacewatch || — || align=right data-sort-value="0.67" | 670 m || 
|-id=941 bgcolor=#fefefe
| 430941 ||  || — || October 25, 2005 || Kitt Peak || Spacewatch || — || align=right data-sort-value="0.86" | 860 m || 
|-id=942 bgcolor=#fefefe
| 430942 ||  || — || October 25, 2005 || Kitt Peak || Spacewatch || NYS || align=right data-sort-value="0.74" | 740 m || 
|-id=943 bgcolor=#fefefe
| 430943 ||  || — || October 25, 2005 || Kitt Peak || Spacewatch || — || align=right | 1.1 km || 
|-id=944 bgcolor=#E9E9E9
| 430944 ||  || — || October 25, 2005 || Kitt Peak || Spacewatch || — || align=right | 1.2 km || 
|-id=945 bgcolor=#E9E9E9
| 430945 ||  || — || October 25, 2005 || Kitt Peak || Spacewatch || — || align=right | 1.4 km || 
|-id=946 bgcolor=#fefefe
| 430946 ||  || — || October 28, 2005 || Mount Lemmon || Mount Lemmon Survey || — || align=right data-sort-value="0.74" | 740 m || 
|-id=947 bgcolor=#E9E9E9
| 430947 ||  || — || October 26, 2005 || Kitt Peak || Spacewatch || — || align=right data-sort-value="0.80" | 800 m || 
|-id=948 bgcolor=#E9E9E9
| 430948 ||  || — || October 28, 2005 || Kitt Peak || Spacewatch || RAF || align=right data-sort-value="0.82" | 820 m || 
|-id=949 bgcolor=#E9E9E9
| 430949 ||  || — || September 29, 2005 || Mount Lemmon || Mount Lemmon Survey || — || align=right | 1.1 km || 
|-id=950 bgcolor=#fefefe
| 430950 ||  || — || April 20, 2004 || Kitt Peak || Spacewatch || — || align=right data-sort-value="0.77" | 770 m || 
|-id=951 bgcolor=#fefefe
| 430951 ||  || — || October 27, 2005 || Kitt Peak || Spacewatch || V || align=right data-sort-value="0.61" | 610 m || 
|-id=952 bgcolor=#fefefe
| 430952 ||  || — || October 30, 2005 || Kitt Peak || Spacewatch || — || align=right data-sort-value="0.90" | 900 m || 
|-id=953 bgcolor=#E9E9E9
| 430953 ||  || — || September 24, 2005 || Kitt Peak || Spacewatch || ADE || align=right | 1.6 km || 
|-id=954 bgcolor=#d6d6d6
| 430954 ||  || — || October 26, 2005 || Kitt Peak || Spacewatch || 7:4 || align=right | 3.1 km || 
|-id=955 bgcolor=#d6d6d6
| 430955 ||  || — || October 29, 2005 || Kitt Peak || Spacewatch || SHU3:2 || align=right | 4.5 km || 
|-id=956 bgcolor=#E9E9E9
| 430956 ||  || — || October 25, 2005 || Apache Point || A. C. Becker || EUN || align=right data-sort-value="0.88" | 880 m || 
|-id=957 bgcolor=#d6d6d6
| 430957 ||  || — || October 25, 2005 || Apache Point || A. C. Becker || 7:4 || align=right | 3.1 km || 
|-id=958 bgcolor=#fefefe
| 430958 ||  || — || October 29, 2005 || Kitt Peak || Spacewatch || — || align=right data-sort-value="0.83" | 830 m || 
|-id=959 bgcolor=#fefefe
| 430959 ||  || — || November 1, 2005 || Kitt Peak || Spacewatch || MAS || align=right data-sort-value="0.72" | 720 m || 
|-id=960 bgcolor=#fefefe
| 430960 ||  || — || November 4, 2005 || Kitt Peak || Spacewatch || V || align=right data-sort-value="0.70" | 700 m || 
|-id=961 bgcolor=#E9E9E9
| 430961 ||  || — || November 3, 2005 || Kitt Peak || Spacewatch || — || align=right data-sort-value="0.83" | 830 m || 
|-id=962 bgcolor=#E9E9E9
| 430962 ||  || — || November 22, 2005 || Kitt Peak || Spacewatch || EUN || align=right | 1.1 km || 
|-id=963 bgcolor=#E9E9E9
| 430963 ||  || — || November 21, 2005 || Kitt Peak || Spacewatch || — || align=right data-sort-value="0.94" | 940 m || 
|-id=964 bgcolor=#E9E9E9
| 430964 ||  || — || November 22, 2005 || Kitt Peak || Spacewatch || — || align=right data-sort-value="0.76" | 760 m || 
|-id=965 bgcolor=#E9E9E9
| 430965 ||  || — || November 21, 2005 || Kitt Peak || Spacewatch || — || align=right | 2.2 km || 
|-id=966 bgcolor=#E9E9E9
| 430966 ||  || — || November 25, 2005 || Kitt Peak || Spacewatch || — || align=right data-sort-value="0.63" | 630 m || 
|-id=967 bgcolor=#E9E9E9
| 430967 ||  || — || November 25, 2005 || Mount Lemmon || Mount Lemmon Survey || — || align=right data-sort-value="0.82" | 820 m || 
|-id=968 bgcolor=#E9E9E9
| 430968 ||  || — || November 25, 2005 || Kitt Peak || Spacewatch || — || align=right | 1.6 km || 
|-id=969 bgcolor=#E9E9E9
| 430969 ||  || — || November 25, 2005 || Kitt Peak || Spacewatch || — || align=right | 1.1 km || 
|-id=970 bgcolor=#fefefe
| 430970 ||  || — || November 21, 2005 || Anderson Mesa || LONEOS || H || align=right data-sort-value="0.83" | 830 m || 
|-id=971 bgcolor=#d6d6d6
| 430971 ||  || — || November 25, 2005 || Kitt Peak || Spacewatch || SHU3:2 || align=right | 4.3 km || 
|-id=972 bgcolor=#E9E9E9
| 430972 ||  || — || November 25, 2005 || Kitt Peak || Spacewatch || — || align=right data-sort-value="0.75" | 750 m || 
|-id=973 bgcolor=#FA8072
| 430973 ||  || — || November 25, 2005 || Catalina || CSS || — || align=right data-sort-value="0.66" | 660 m || 
|-id=974 bgcolor=#E9E9E9
| 430974 ||  || — || November 25, 2005 || Mount Lemmon || Mount Lemmon Survey || — || align=right data-sort-value="0.91" | 910 m || 
|-id=975 bgcolor=#E9E9E9
| 430975 ||  || — || November 26, 2005 || Kitt Peak || Spacewatch || — || align=right | 1.7 km || 
|-id=976 bgcolor=#E9E9E9
| 430976 ||  || — || November 26, 2005 || Kitt Peak || Spacewatch || — || align=right | 2.9 km || 
|-id=977 bgcolor=#E9E9E9
| 430977 ||  || — || November 30, 2005 || Kitt Peak || Spacewatch || — || align=right | 1.9 km || 
|-id=978 bgcolor=#E9E9E9
| 430978 ||  || — || November 29, 2005 || Mount Lemmon || Mount Lemmon Survey || — || align=right | 2.8 km || 
|-id=979 bgcolor=#E9E9E9
| 430979 ||  || — || November 28, 2005 || Catalina || CSS || — || align=right | 1.8 km || 
|-id=980 bgcolor=#E9E9E9
| 430980 ||  || — || November 25, 2005 || Mount Lemmon || Mount Lemmon Survey || — || align=right data-sort-value="0.81" | 810 m || 
|-id=981 bgcolor=#E9E9E9
| 430981 ||  || — || November 26, 2005 || Mount Lemmon || Mount Lemmon Survey || — || align=right | 1.6 km || 
|-id=982 bgcolor=#fefefe
| 430982 ||  || — || November 29, 2005 || Mount Lemmon || Mount Lemmon Survey || H || align=right data-sort-value="0.96" | 960 m || 
|-id=983 bgcolor=#E9E9E9
| 430983 ||  || — || November 25, 2005 || Kitt Peak || Spacewatch || — || align=right data-sort-value="0.80" | 800 m || 
|-id=984 bgcolor=#fefefe
| 430984 ||  || — || November 29, 2005 || Kitt Peak || Spacewatch || — || align=right data-sort-value="0.90" | 900 m || 
|-id=985 bgcolor=#E9E9E9
| 430985 ||  || — || November 29, 2005 || Kitt Peak || Spacewatch || — || align=right | 1.2 km || 
|-id=986 bgcolor=#E9E9E9
| 430986 ||  || — || November 25, 2005 || Mount Lemmon || Mount Lemmon Survey || — || align=right | 1.3 km || 
|-id=987 bgcolor=#fefefe
| 430987 ||  || — || November 28, 2005 || Mount Lemmon || Mount Lemmon Survey || — || align=right | 2.2 km || 
|-id=988 bgcolor=#E9E9E9
| 430988 ||  || — || November 28, 2005 || Kitt Peak || Spacewatch || — || align=right | 1.2 km || 
|-id=989 bgcolor=#E9E9E9
| 430989 ||  || — || November 30, 2005 || Mount Lemmon || Mount Lemmon Survey || — || align=right data-sort-value="0.74" | 740 m || 
|-id=990 bgcolor=#E9E9E9
| 430990 ||  || — || November 28, 2005 || Catalina || CSS || — || align=right | 1.4 km || 
|-id=991 bgcolor=#fefefe
| 430991 ||  || — || December 1, 2005 || Mount Lemmon || Mount Lemmon Survey || MAS || align=right data-sort-value="0.77" | 770 m || 
|-id=992 bgcolor=#E9E9E9
| 430992 ||  || — || December 2, 2005 || Mount Lemmon || Mount Lemmon Survey || — || align=right | 1.7 km || 
|-id=993 bgcolor=#E9E9E9
| 430993 ||  || — || December 4, 2005 || Kitt Peak || Spacewatch || (5) || align=right data-sort-value="0.78" | 780 m || 
|-id=994 bgcolor=#E9E9E9
| 430994 ||  || — || December 2, 2005 || Kitt Peak || Spacewatch || MAR || align=right data-sort-value="0.94" | 940 m || 
|-id=995 bgcolor=#E9E9E9
| 430995 ||  || — || December 2, 2005 || Kitt Peak || Spacewatch || — || align=right data-sort-value="0.95" | 950 m || 
|-id=996 bgcolor=#E9E9E9
| 430996 ||  || — || December 2, 2005 || Kitt Peak || Spacewatch || — || align=right | 1.0 km || 
|-id=997 bgcolor=#E9E9E9
| 430997 ||  || — || December 5, 2005 || Kitt Peak || Spacewatch || — || align=right | 1.1 km || 
|-id=998 bgcolor=#E9E9E9
| 430998 ||  || — || December 10, 2005 || Pla D'Arguines || Pla D'Arguines Obs. || — || align=right | 1.8 km || 
|-id=999 bgcolor=#E9E9E9
| 430999 ||  || — || December 7, 2005 || Kitt Peak || Spacewatch || (5) || align=right data-sort-value="0.69" | 690 m || 
|-id=000 bgcolor=#d6d6d6
| 431000 ||  || — || December 22, 2005 || Kitt Peak || Spacewatch || — || align=right | 2.7 km || 
|}

References

External links 
 Discovery Circumstances: Numbered Minor Planets (430001)–(435000) (IAU Minor Planet Center)

0430